The Port Adelaide–Norwood rivalry is Australian rules football's oldest and one of its most intense rivalries. It is contested between the Norwood Football Club and the Port Adelaide Football Club. Together Port Adelaide (36) and Norwood (31) have won 66 South Australian National Football League (SANFL) premierships since the founding of the competition in 1878. As the SANFL competition has been suspended due to war, only 132 seasons have been played, therefore together Norwood and Port Adelaide have won exactly half of all SANFL premierships awarded. The two clubs have met in finals 50 times with 17 of those grand finals including 2 war-time grand finals.

Origins

The two clubs first played each other in 1878. The rivalry's origins go back to the early 1880s, when Port Adelaide finally ended Norwood's run of six consecutive premierships. During the 1880s and 1890s matches between Norwood and Port Adelaide would often attract around 12,000 spectators which would be equivalent to over 10% of Adelaide's population of the time.

In 1893 when describing the Norwood–Port Adelaide rivalry the Advertiser stated that "Just as the more faithful amongst the tribes of the East feel it incumbent on them to pay a periodical visit to Mecca, so do lovers of the king of winter games feel it almost an essential duty on their part to journey to the Adelaide Oval on the Queen's Accession Day, in sunshine or rain, to witness a trial of strength between those great and old rivals the Port Adelaide and Norwood clubs." In 1960, Norwood would bring Port Adelaide's own run of six premierships to an end defeating them by 27 points in the Preliminary Final. As of 2017, the two clubs are the only clubs in any of the elite Australian Rules Football leagues (the SANFL, WAFL, and VFL/AFL) to win six successive premierships.

Two powerhouses

Off-field rivals

Geographic and class divide

Port Adelaide and Norwood are located on opposite sides of Adelaide, with the north-western side of the city traditionally being associated with blue-collar workers and the eastern side of the city white-collar professionals. This economic split is reflected in house prices with Norwood properties in 2015 commanding an average $900,000 whereas Port Adelaide properties are around a third of that at $315,000.

Rival AFL licence bids
Talk of a side from South Australia entering the Victorian Football League (VFL) was fast-tracked in 1987 when a team from Western Australia, the West Coast Eagles, and a team from Brisbane, the Brisbane Bears joined the VFL.  This left South Australia as the only mainland state in Australia without a team in an increasingly national competition. By 1989 seven out of ten SANFL clubs were recording losses and the combined income of the SANFL and West Australian Football League (WAFL) had dropped to 40% of the VFL. During early 1990 the SANFL decided to wait three years before making any further decision in regards to fielding a South Australian side in the VFL until it could be done without negatively affecting football within the state. Frustrated with lack of progress, Port Adelaide held secret negotiations in the town of Quorn regarding entering the VFL in 1991. From these discussions, Port Adelaide accepted an invitation from the VFL (which had since been renamed the Australian Football League).  The AFL signed a heads of agreement with the club in expectation that Port would enter the competition in 1991, meaning the Port Adelaide Football Club would field two teams, one in the AFL and one in the SANFL.

During the 1990 preseason Port Adelaide played a practice match against Geelong at Football Park in front of 35,000 spectators. When the knowledge of Port Adelaide's negotiations to gain an AFL licence were made public, the rest of the SANFL and many other people across the state saw it as an act of treachery. SANFL clubs made an application to the Supreme Court of South Australia for an injunction against the bid, which Justice Olsson agreed to. The AFL suggested to the SANFL that if they did not want Port Adelaide to join the AFL, they could put forward a counter bid to enter a composite South Australian side into the AFL.  After legal action from all parties, the AFL finally agreed to accept the SANFL's bid and the Adelaide Football Club was born.

The fallout from the failed bid resulted in some calling for Port Adelaide to be expelled from the SANFL. However, Port Adelaide continued to compete and continued to dominate.  The Magpies followed their triple triumphs from 1988 to 1990 with a premiership in 1992 and three in a row again from 1994 to 1996, then again in 1998 and 1999.

In 1994, the AFL announced it would award a second AFL licence to a South Australian club. Adelaide's Channel 7 broadcaster ran a phone poll asking whether Port Adelaide should get the second licence with 74% of the 6000 respondents saying 'yes'. However a licence did not guarantee entry and although a target year of 1996 was set, this was reliant upon an existing AFL club folding or merging with another.  In 1996, the cash-strapped Fitzroy announced it would merge with the Brisbane Bears to form the Brisbane Lions.  A spot had finally opened and it was announced that in 1997, one year later than expected, Port Adelaide would enter the AFL.

Famous matches

1882 SAFA round 4 
What was Port Adelaide's first win over Norwood in its 10th attempt would also be the point of much contestation. Norwood and the SAFA would strip the game of premiership points for a rematch later in the year. This was due to an umpire disallowing a Norwood goal kicked by Watson due to believing it was touched by Port Adelaide player Gliddon.

1882 SAFA round 8 
The following game after the annulled result of what would have been Port Adelaide's first win over Norwood was controversial before the game started. Prior to the match there was a misunderstanding about whether opposition players had to present tickets to gain entry to grounds. The gatekeeper at Alberton Oval refused free entry to the Norwood players. As the Norwood players were about to return to the train station recently retired Port Adelaide player Thomas Smith insisted that they be granted free entry. This incident contributed to significant "bad blood" between the clubs according to Adelaide newspapers.

1884 SAFA final round 

The final game of the 1884 season held on Saturday 30 August was essentially a playoff for the premiership as it guaranteed the winner top spot on the association ladder. Therefore, considerable interest was built up for the game with the crowd approximately 5,000 attending. Norwood, having won the last six premierships in a row, met Port Adelaide who were yet to win a premiership. The result comfortably went the way of Port Adelaide, much to the dismay of Norwood.

1889 SAFA Premiership Playoff

The first premiership-deciding match in a major Australian rules football was held on Saturday 5 October 1889 in South Australia. At the time Norwood were reigning Australian champions. The game was required as Norwood and Port Adelaide finished the season with an identical win–loss ratio. The teams entered the first break with scores level at three goals each. Only one goal was scored in the second quarter by Norwood, with the wind substantially effecting play. Port wrestled back to even the ledger during the third quarter, but only briefly as Norwood kicked a goal late in the period with the scores into the final quarter being five goals to four. Norwood had the ascendancy in the last period of game and although Port kicking its fifth goal it was to no avail. The final score was seven goals to five in Norwood's favour. The match was one of the seeds to the intense rivalry between Port Adelaide and Norwood.

1904 SAFA Challenge Final

The 1904 Grand Final was a memorable one for Norwood who were down by 35 points at three-quarter time against traditional rival Port Adelaide. Norwood then produced an extraordinary burst of football with a goal by centre half-forward Dean Dawson followed by two goals each from full forward, Bill Miller and half-forward flanker, Stan Robinson. Norwood was only two points down with a minute remaining. Tommy Gibbons held a mark on a seemingly impossible angle.  His kick sailed through the goal posts to give Norwood a four-point victory, 9.8 to 8.10.

1957 SANFL Grand Final 
The 1957 SANFL Grand Final holds the record for the largest crowd of 58,924 between the two clubs. This remains the fourth largest crowd for a football match in South Australia. Norwood led the match for the majority of the day but Port Adelaide's five-goal-to-two final quarter allowed them to win by 11 points claiming their fourth premiership in a row.

1960 SANFL Preliminary Final 

Port Adelaide had finished the home and away season as minor premier and looked on track to make rebound from the previous week's loss against North Adelaide to attempt to win its seventh consecutive premiership. Norwood, who had finished the home and away season in third place was desperate to beat Port Adelaide in the preliminary final in order to prevent the Magpies from bettering its run of six consecutive premierships set from 1878 to 1883. The weather was unfavourable, with a large amount of rain causing the ground to become slush. Commentators considered it one of the most brutal finals played in memory. The game was in the balance heading into the final quarter with the scoreboard reflecting the scrappy nature of the game; Norwood 3.14 (32) lead Port Adelaide 3.10 (28). Norwood managed to adapt to the conditions in the final quarter kicking 5.1, whereas Port Adelaide could only muster 1.2. The final scores were in favour of Norwood 8.11 (59) to Port Adelaide 3.14 (32). It is a coincidence that Norwood brought an end to Port Adelaide's run of six premierships from 1954–1959 as Port Adelaide did the same to Norwood's run of six between 1878–1883. After the match during the dark of night Haydn Bunton Jr and John Vickers went to Black Diamond Corner in Port Adelaide and painted it red and blue.

1996 SANFL Preliminary Final 

The game was close all the way through and Norwood was leading by two points deep into time on when Trevor Growden gave Scott Hodges a free kick in the north-west pocket of Football Park. Scott Hodges from 45m out on an angle of 45 degrees kicked the goal after missing easier shots throughout the match. This would be the two clubs final encounter before Port Adelaide entered the Australian Football League.

Venues
The vast majority of the games played between Port Adelaide and Norwood have been at Alberton Oval, Norwood Oval, Football Park, and Adelaide Oval.

Senior matches (1877–1996)

|+
|- style="background:#ccf; text-align: center;"
| colspan="11" |South Australian Football Association
|- style="background:#ccf;"
| Year
| Date
| 
| Home team
| 
| Away team
|
| Football ground
| width="45" | Crowd
| Winner
|M
|- style="background:#fff;"
| rowspan="2" bgcolor="navy" style="text-align: center;" div |1878
| 15/6
|  5
|  Port Adelaide
| 0._ (0)
| style="background:#ccffcc;" |  Norwood
| style="background:#ccffcc;" |1._ (1)
| Glanville Estate
| 600
| bgcolor="Navy" style="color:red" align="center" | Norwood
!1
|- style="background:#fff;"
| 10/8
|  13
|  Norwood
| 0.4 (0)
|  Port Adelaide
| 0.4 (0)
| East Park Lands
|3,000
| bgcolor="white" style="color:black" align="center" | Draw
!0
|- style="background:#fff;"
| rowspan="2" bgcolor="navy" style="text-align: center;" div |1879
| 14/6
|  4
|  Port Adelaide
| 1._ (0)
| style="background:#ccffcc;" | Norwood
| style="background:#ccffcc;" |3._ (3)
| Glanville Estate
| 1,000
| bgcolor="Navy" style="color:red" align="center" | Norwood
!2
|- style="background:#fff;"
| 23/8
|  11
| style="background:#ccffcc;" | Norwood
| style="background:#ccffcc;" |3._ (3)
|  Port Adelaide
| 1._ (1)
| East Park Lands
|3,000
| bgcolor="Navy" style="color:red" align="center" | Norwood
!2
|- style="background:#fff;"
| rowspan="2" bgcolor="navy" style="text-align: center;" div |1880
| 8/5
|  1
| style="background:#ccffcc;" | Norwood
| style="background:#ccffcc;" |5.17 (5)
|  Port Adelaide
| 0.3 (0)
| East Park Lands
| 1,500
| bgcolor="Navy" style="color:red" align="center" | Norwood
!5
|- style="background:#fff;"
| 17/7
|  11
|  Port Adelaide
| 0.4 (0)
|  Norwood
| 0.18 (0)
| Alberton Oval
|750
| bgcolor="white" style="color:black" align="center" | Draw
!
|- style="background:#fff;"
| rowspan="3" bgcolor="navy" style="text-align: center;" div |1881
| 14/5
|  2
| style="background:#ccffcc;" | Norwood
| style="background:#ccffcc;" |4.8 (4)
|  Port Adelaide
| 1.3 (1)
| Adelaide Oval
| 1,500
| bgcolor="Navy" style="color:red" align="center" | Norwood
!3
|- style="background:#fff;"
| 2/7
|  7
|  Port Adelaide
| 1.11 (1)
|  Norwood
| 1.16 (1)
| Alberton Oval
|
| bgcolor="white" style="color:black" align="center" | Draw
!
|- style="background:#fff;"
| 24/9
|  16
| style="background:#ccffcc;" | Norwood
| style="background:#ccffcc;" |6.14 (6)
|  Port Adelaide
| 0.0 (0)
| East Park Lands
| 
| bgcolor="Navy" style="color:red" align="center" | Norwood
!6
|- style="background:#fff;"
| rowspan="2" bgcolor="navy" style="text-align: center;" div |1882
| 27/5
|  4
|  Norwood
| 1.16 (1)
| style="background:#ccffcc;" | Port Adelaide
| style="background:#ccffcc;" |2.11 (2)
| Adelaide Oval
| 
| bgcolor="yellow" style="color:black" align="center" | Result Annulled
!1
|- style="background:#fff;"
| 15/7
|  9
|  Port Adelaide
| 0.2 (0)
| style="background:#ccffcc;" | Norwood
| style="background:#ccffcc;" |3.17 (3)
| Alberton Oval
|
| bgcolor="Navy" style="color:red" align="center" | Norwood
!3
|- style="background:#fff;"
| rowspan="4" bgcolor="navy" style="text-align: center;" div |1883
| 12 May
|  2
|  Port Adelaide
| 1.7 (1)
| style="background:#ccffcc;" | Norwood
| style="background:#ccffcc;" |4.9 (4)
| Alberton Oval
| 1,000
| bgcolor="Navy" style="color:red" align="center" | Norwood
!3
|- style="background:#fff;"
| 21 July
|  10
|  Norwood
| 1.9 (1)
| style="background:#ccffcc;" | Port Adelaide
| style="background:#ccffcc;" |5.7 (5)
| Adelaide Oval
| 1,300
| bgcolor="Black" style="color:white" align="center" | Port Adelaide
!4
|- style="background:#fff;"
|25/8
|  15
|  Port Adelaide
| 3.12 (3)
| style="background:#ccffcc;" | Norwood
| style="background:#ccffcc;" |6.17 (6)
| Alberton Oval
| 
| bgcolor="Navy" style="color:red" align="center" | Norwood
!3
|- style="background:#fff;"
| 22/9
|  19
| style="background:#ccffcc;" |  Norwood
| style="background:#ccffcc;" | 5.22 (5)
|  Port Adelaide
| 1.7 (1)
| Kensington Oval
| 
| bgcolor="Navy" style="color:red" align="center" | Norwood
!4
|- style="background:#fff;"
| rowspan="4" bgcolor="black" style="text-align: center;" div |1884
| 17 May
|  3
|  Port Adelaide
| 2.10 (2)
| style="background:#ccffcc;" | Norwood
| style="background:#ccffcc;" |3.15 (3)
| Alberton Oval
| 1,500
| bgcolor="Navy" style="color:red" align="center" | Norwood
!1
|- style="background:#fff;"
| 20 June
|  8
|  Norwood
| 3.3 (3)
|  Port Adelaide
| 3.17 (3)
| Adelaide Oval
| 6,000
| bgcolor="white" style="color:black" align="center" | Draw
!
|- style="background:#fff;"
|2/8
|  11
| style="background:#ccffcc;" | Port Adelaide
| style="background:#ccffcc;" |8.11 (8)
|  Norwood
| 3.10 (3)
| Alberton Oval
| 
| bgcolor="Black" style="color:white" align="center" | Port Adelaide
!5
|- style="background:#fff;"
|30/8
|  13
|  Norwood 
| 0.11 (0)
| style="background:#ccffcc;" | Port Adelaide
| style="background:#ccffcc;" |3.15 (3)
| Adelaide Oval
| 5,000
| bgcolor="Black" style="color:white" align="center" | Port Adelaide
!3
|- style="background:#fff;"
| rowspan="4" style="text-align: center;" div |1885
| 4 July
|  6
|  Port Adelaide
| 2.12 (2)
| style="background:#ccffcc;" | Norwood
| style="background:#ccffcc;" |3.8 (3)
| Alberton Oval
| 2,000
| bgcolor="Navy" style="color:red" align="center" | Norwood
!1
|- style="background:#fff;"
| 25 July
|  9
| style="background:#ccffcc;" | Norwood
| style="background:#ccffcc;" |3.11 (3)
|  Port Adelaide
| 2.6 (2)
| Adelaide Oval
| 1,000
| bgcolor="Navy" style="color:red" align="center" | Norwood
!1
|- style="background:#fff;"
|2/8
|  13
|  Port Adelaide
| 1.13 (1)
| style="background:#ccffcc;" | Norwood
| style="background:#ccffcc;" |6.16 (6)
| Alberton Oval
| 2,000
| bgcolor="Navy" style="color:red" align="center" | Norwood
!6
|- style="background:#fff;"
| 12/9
|  16
| style="background:#ccffcc;" | Norwood 
| style="background:#ccffcc;" |4.14 (4)
|  Port Adelaide
| 2.8 (2)
| Kensington Oval
| 800
| bgcolor="Navy" style="color:red" align="center" | Norwood
!2
|- style="background:#fff;"
| rowspan="5" style="text-align: center;" div |1886
| 8 May
|  3
|  Port Adelaide
| 1.5 (1)
| style="background:#ccffcc;" | Norwood
| style="background:#ccffcc;" |4.7 (4)
| Alberton Oval
| 1,500
| bgcolor="Navy" style="color:red" align="center" | Norwood
!3
|- style="background:#fff;"
| 22 May
|  5
| style="background:#ccffcc;" | Norwood
| style="background:#ccffcc;" |4.9 (4)
|  Port Adelaide
| 3.6 (3)
| Adelaide Oval
| 1,500
| bgcolor="Navy" style="color:red" align="center" | Norwood
!1
|- style="background:#fff;"
| 5 June
|  8
| style="background:#ccffcc;" | Norwood
| style="background:#ccffcc;" |5.13 (5)
|  Port Adelaide
| 2.3 (2)
| Kensington Oval
| 500
| bgcolor="Navy" style="color:red" align="center" | Norwood
!3
|- style="background:#fff;"
| 21 June
|  11
| style="background:#ccffcc;" | Norwood 
| style="background:#ccffcc;" |8.13 (8)
|  Port Adelaide
| 2.11 (2)
| Adelaide Oval
| 6,000
| bgcolor="Navy" style="color:red" align="center" | Norwood
!6
|- style="background:#fff;"
| 24 July
|  13
|  Port Adelaide 
| 3.13 (3)
|  Norwood
| 3.7 (3)
| Alberton Oval
| 1,000
| bgcolor="white" style="color:black" align="center" | Draw
!
|- style="background:#fff;"
| rowspan="4" bgcolor="navy" style="text-align: center;" div |1887
| 21 May
|  3
|  Port Adelaide
| 3.4 (3)
|  Norwood
| 3.7 (3)
| Alberton Oval
| 3,000
| bgcolor="white" style="color:black" align="center" | Draw
!
|- style="background:#fff;"
| 20 June
|  8
| style="background:#ccffcc;" | Norwood
| style="background:#ccffcc;" |6.16 (6)
|  Port Adelaide
| 4.3 (4)
| Adelaide Oval
| 11,000
| bgcolor="Navy" style="color:red" align="center" | Norwood
!2
|- style="background:#fff;"
| 23 July
|  11
|  Port Adelaide
| 4.1 (4)
|  Norwood
| 4.8 (4)
| Alberton Oval
| 3,500
| bgcolor="white" style="color:black" align="center" | Draw
!
|- style="background:#fff;"
|20/8
|  15
| style="background:#ccffcc;" | Norwood
| style="background:#ccffcc;" |5.11 (5)
|  Port Adelaide
| 2.9 (1)
| Adelaide Oval
| 8,000
| bgcolor="Navy" style="color:red" align="center" | Norwood
!3
|- style="background:#fff;"
| rowspan="3" bgcolor="navy" style="text-align: center;" div |1888
| 20 June
|  9
|  Norwood
| 2.7 (2)
|  Port Adelaide
| 2.5 (2)
| Adelaide Oval
| 9,000
| bgcolor="white" style="color:black" align="center" | Draw
!
|- style="background:#fff;"
| 28 July
|  13
| style="background:#ccffcc;" | Norwood
| style="background:#ccffcc;" |11.21 (11)
|  Port Adelaide
| 3.6 (3)
| Kensington Oval
| 7,000
| bgcolor="Navy" style="color:red" align="center" | Norwood
!8
|- style="background:#fff;"
| 22/9
| 
| style="background:#ccffcc;" | Port Adelaide
| style="background:#ccffcc;" |6.11 (6)
|  Norwood
| 5.14 (5)
| Alberton Oval
| 2,500
| bgcolor="Black" style="color:white" align="center" |Port Adelaide
!1
|- style="background:#fff;"
| rowspan="5" bgcolor="navy" style="text-align: center;" div |1889
| 11 May
| 
| style="background:#ccffcc;" | Norwood
| style="background:#ccffcc;" |7.5 (7)
|  Port Adelaide
| 2.7 (2)
| Kensington Oval
| 4,000
| bgcolor="Navy" style="color:red" align="center" | Norwood
!5
|- style="background:#fff;"
| 20 June
| 
| style="background:#ccffcc;" | Norwood
| style="background:#ccffcc;" |6.6 (6)
|  Port Adelaide
| 3.4 (3)
| Adelaide Oval
| 8,000
| bgcolor="Navy" style="color:red" align="center" | Norwood
!3
|- style="background:#fff;"
| 29 July
| 
| style="background:#ccffcc;" | Port Adelaide
| style="background:#ccffcc;" |3.5 (3)
|  Norwood
| 2.6 (2)
| Alberton Oval
| 6,500
| bgcolor="Black" style="color:white" align="center" |Port Adelaide
!1
|- style="background:#fff;"
|24/8
| 
|  Norwood
| 3.8 (3)
|  Port Adelaide
| 3.7 (3)
| Adelaide Oval
| 8,000
| bgcolor="white" style="color:black" align="center" | Draw
!
|- style="background:#fff;"
|5/10
| bgcolor="gold" |GF
| style="background:#ccffcc;" | Norwood
| style="background:#ccffcc;" |7.4 (7)
|  Port Adelaide
| 5.9 (5)
| Adelaide Oval
| 11,000
| bgcolor="Navy" style="color:red" align="center" | Norwood
!2
|- style="background:#fff;"
| rowspan="4" bgcolor="black" style="text-align: center;" div |1890
| 17 May
| 2
|  Port Adelaide
| 1.4 (1)
| style="background:#ccffcc;" | Norwood
| style="background:#ccffcc;" |2.9 (2)
| Alberton Oval
| 3,000
| bgcolor="Navy" style="color:red" align="center" | Norwood
!1
|- style="background:#fff;"
| 20 June
| 6
|  Norwood
| 3.3 (3)
| style="background:#ccffcc;" | Port Adelaide
| style="background:#ccffcc;" |5.10 (5)
| Adelaide Oval
| 10,000
| bgcolor="Black" style="color:white" align="center" |Port Adelaide
!2
|- style="background:#fff;"
| 26 July
| 10
| style="background:#ccffcc;" | Norwood
| style="background:#ccffcc;" |6.7 (6)
|  Port Adelaide
| 3.7 (3)
| Kensington Oval
| 8,000
| bgcolor="Navy" style="color:red" align="center" | Norwood
!3
|- style="background:#fff;"
|29/8
| 15
|  Norwood 
| 2.7 (2)
| style="background:#ccffcc;" | Port Adelaide
| style="background:#ccffcc;" |3.2 (3)
| Adelaide Oval
| 11,500
| bgcolor="Black" style="color:white" align="center" | Port Adelaide
!1
|- style="background:#fff;"
| rowspan="4" bgcolor="navy" style="text-align: center;" div |1891
| 16 May
| 3
|  Norwood
| 4.6 (4)
| style="background:#ccffcc;" | Port Adelaide
| style="background:#ccffcc;" |9.3 (9)
| Kensington Oval
| 5,000
| bgcolor="Black" style="color:white" align="center" | Port Adelaide
!5
|- style="background:#fff;"
| 22 June
| 9
| style="background:#ccffcc;" | Norwood
| style="background:#ccffcc;" |6.11 (6)
|  Port Adelaide
| 5.6 (5)
| Adelaide Oval
| 13,000
| bgcolor="Navy" style="color:red" align="center" | Norwood
!1
|- style="background:#fff;"
| 11 July
| 12
|  Norwood
| 1.3 (3)
| style="background:#ccffcc;" | Port Adelaide
| style="background:#ccffcc;" |6.9 (6)
| Adelaide Oval
| 8,000
| bgcolor="Black" style="color:white" align="center" |Port Adelaide
!5
|- style="background:#fff;"
| 5/9
| 19
| style="background:#ccffcc;" | Norwood
| style="background:#ccffcc;" |5.4 (5)
|  Port Adelaide
| 3.4 (3)
| Adelaide Oval
| 10,000
| bgcolor="Navy" style="color:red" align="center" | Norwood
!2
|- style="background:#fff;"
| rowspan="4" style="text-align: center;" div |1892
| 21 May
| 3
| style="background:#ccffcc;" | Port Adelaide
| style="background:#ccffcc;" |9.4 (9)
|  Norwood
| 8.7 (8)
| Kensington Oval
| 4,000
| bgcolor="Black" style="color:white" align="center" | Port Adelaide
!1
|- style="background:#fff;"
| 20 June
| 
|  Norwood
| 2.11 (2)
| style="background:#ccffcc;" | Port Adelaide
| style="background:#ccffcc;" |3.4 (3)
| Adelaide Oval
| 12,000
| bgcolor="Black" style="color:white" align="center" | Port Adelaide
!1
|- style="background:#fff;"
| 1 July
| 
| style="background:#ccffcc;" | Norwood
| style="background:#ccffcc;" |5.5 (5)
|  Port Adelaide
| 2.6 (2)
| Adelaide Oval
| 6,000
| bgcolor="Navy" style="color:red" align="center" | Norwood
!3
|- style="background:#fff;"
| 10/9
| 
|  Norwood
| 5.10 (5)
| style="background:#ccffcc;" | Port Adelaide
| style="background:#ccffcc;" |8.15 (8)
| Adelaide Oval
| 4,000
| bgcolor="Black" style="color:white" align="center" | Port Adelaide
!3
|- style="background:#fff;"
| rowspan="5" style="text-align: center;" div |1893
| 3 June
| 
| style="background:#ccffcc;" | Norwood
| style="background:#ccffcc;" |6.8 (6)
|  Port Adelaide
| 5.4 (5)
| Adelaide Oval
| 8,500
| bgcolor="Navy" style="color:red" align="center" | Norwood
!1
|- style="background:#fff;"
| 20 June
| 
| style="background:#ccffcc;" | Norwood
| style="background:#ccffcc;" |5.9 (5)
|  Port Adelaide
| 4.5 (4)
| Adelaide Oval
| 12,000
| bgcolor="Navy" style="color:red" align="center" | Norwood
!1
|- style="background:#fff;"
| 1 July
| 
|  Norwood
| 1.6 (1)
| style="background:#ccffcc;" | Port Adelaide
| style="background:#ccffcc;" |5.3 (5)
| Adelaide Oval
| 6,000
| bgcolor="Black" style="color:white" align="center" | Port Adelaide
!4
|- style="background:#fff;"
|10/8
| 
| style="background:#ccffcc;" | Norwood
| style="background:#ccffcc;" |8.5 (8)
|  Port Adelaide
| 6.4 (6)
| Adelaide Oval
| 5,000
| bgcolor="Navy" style="color:red" align="center" | Norwood
!2
|- style="background:#fff;"
| 23/9
| 
|  Norwood
| 7.10 (7)
|  Port Adelaide
| 7.3 (7)
| Adelaide Oval
| 1,500
| align="center" | Draw
!
|- style="background:#fff;"
| rowspan="6" bgcolor="navy" style="text-align: center;" div |1894
| 5 May
| 1
| style="background:#ccffcc;" | Norwood
| style="background:#ccffcc;" |7.11 (7)
|  Port Adelaide
| 5.5 (5)
| Adelaide Oval
| 5,000
| bgcolor="Navy" style="color:red" align="center" | Norwood
!3
|- style="background:#fff;"
| 9 June
| 6
| style="background:#ccffcc;" | Norwood
| style="background:#ccffcc;" |8.9 (8)
|  Port Adelaide
| 7.9 (7)
| Adelaide Oval
| 5,500
| bgcolor="Navy" style="color:red" align="center" | Norwood
!1
|- style="background:#fff;"
| 25 June
| 8
| style="background:#ccffcc;" | Norwood
| style="background:#ccffcc;" | 9.7 (9)
|  Port Adelaide
| 2.6 (2)
| Adelaide Oval
| 9,000
| bgcolor="Navy" style="color:red" align="center" | Norwood
!7
|- style="background:#fff;"
| 14 July
| 12
|  Norwood
| 5.3 (5)
| style="background:#ccffcc;" | Port Adelaide
| style="background:#ccffcc;" |7.7 (7)
| Adelaide Oval
| 1,800
| bgcolor="Black" style="color:white" align="center" | Port Adelaide
!2
|- style="background:#fff;"
| 8/9
| 17
| style="background:#ccffcc;" | Norwood
| style="background:#ccffcc;" |7.10 (7)
|  Port Adelaide
| 3.3 (3)
| Adelaide Oval
| 1,500
| bgcolor="Navy" style="color:red" align="center" | Norwood
!4
|- style="background:#fff;"
|30/9
| 20
| style="background:#ccffcc;" | Norwood
| style="background:#ccffcc;" |7.6 (7)
|  Port Adelaide
| 6.7 (6)
| Adelaide Oval
| 3,000
| bgcolor="Navy" style="color:red" align="center" | Norwood
!1
|- style="background:#fff;"
| rowspan="4" style="text-align: center;" div |1895
| 21 May
| 
| style="background:#ccffcc;" | Norwood
| style="background:#ccffcc;" |9.9 (9)
|  Port Adelaide
| 4.8 (4)
| Kensington Oval
| 1,500
| bgcolor="Navy" style="color:red" align="center" | Norwood
!5
|- style="background:#fff;"
| 24 June
| 
|  Norwood
| 3.10 (3)
|  Port Adelaide
| 3.8 (3)
| Adelaide Oval
| 8,000
| align="center" | Draw
!
|- style="background:#fff;"
| 27 July
| 
| style="background:#ccffcc;" | Norwood
| style="background:#ccffcc;" |5.3 (5)
|  Port Adelaide
| 3.8 (2)
| Adelaide Oval
| 3,500
| bgcolor="Navy" style="color:red" align="center" | Norwood
!2
|- style="background:#fff;"
|21/9
| 
| style="background:#ccffcc;" | Norwood
| style="background:#ccffcc;" |8.9 (8)
|  Port Adelaide
| 4.4 (4)
| Adelaide Oval
| 
| bgcolor="Navy" style="color:red" align="center" | Norwood
!4
|- style="background:#fff;"
| rowspan="5" style="text-align: center;" div |1896
| 6 June
| 6
|  Norwood
| 5.6 (5)
| style="background:#ccffcc;" | Port Adelaide
| style="background:#ccffcc;" |7.9 (7)
| Adelaide Oval
| 
| bgcolor="Black" style="color:white" align="center" | Port Adelaide
!2
|- style="background:#fff;"
| 22 June
| 9
| style="background:#ccffcc;" | Norwood
| style="background:#ccffcc;" |2.10 (2)
|  Port Adelaide
| 0.7 (0)
| Adelaide Oval
| 7,500
| bgcolor="Navy" style="color:red" align="center" | Norwood
!2
|- style="background:#fff;"
| 4 July
| 11
| style="background:#ccffcc;" | Norwood
| style="background:#ccffcc;" |10.11 (10)
|  Port Adelaide
| 5.7 (5)
| Adelaide Oval
| 2,000
| bgcolor="Navy" style="color:red" align="center" | Norwood
!5
|- style="background:#fff;"
| 25 July
| 14
| style="background:#ccffcc;" | Norwood
| style="background:#ccffcc;" |6.11 (6)
|  Port Adelaide
| 3.6 (3)
| Adelaide Oval
| 
| bgcolor="Navy" style="color:red" align="center" | Norwood
!3
|- style="background:#fff;"
|15/8
| 17
| style="background:#ccffcc;" | Norwood
| style="background:#ccffcc;" |6.13 (6)
|  Port Adelaide
| 2.3 (2)
| Adelaide Oval
| 
| bgcolor="Navy" style="color:red" align="center" | Norwood
!4
|- style="background:#fff;"
| rowspan="4" bgcolor="black" style="text-align: center;" div |1897
| 15 May
| 3
| style="background:#ccffcc;" | Norwood
| style="background:#ccffcc;" |3.11 (29)
|  Port Adelaide
| 4.2 (26)
| Adelaide Oval
| 
| bgcolor="Navy" style="color:red" align="center" | Norwood
!3
|- style="background:#fff;"
| 17 July
| 13
|  Norwood
| 3.7 (25)
| style="background:#ccffcc;" | Port Adelaide
| style="background:#ccffcc;" |3.10 (28)
| Adelaide Oval
| 
| bgcolor="Black" style="color:white" align="center" |Port Adelaide
!3
|- style="background:#fff;"
| 31 July
| 15
|  Norwood
| 5.1 (31)
| style="background:#ccffcc;" | Port Adelaide
| style="background:#ccffcc;" |5.7 (37)
| Adelaide Oval
| 4,000
| bgcolor="Black" style="color:white" align="center" |Port Adelaide
!6
|- style="background:#fff;"
|1/9
| 20
|  Norwood 
| 2.6 (30)
|  Port Adelaide
| 2.6 (30)
| Adelaide Oval
| 3,000
| align="center" | Draw
!
|- style="background:#fff;"
| rowspan="5" style="text-align: center;" div |1898
| 30 May
| 4
| style="background:#ccffcc;" | Norwood
| style="background:#ccffcc;" |7.2 (44)
|  Port Adelaide
| 5.6 (36)
| Adelaide Oval
| 4,500
| bgcolor="Navy" style="color:red" align="center" | Norwood
!8
|- style="background:#fff;"
| 9 July
| 9
|  Norwood
| 4.9 (33)
| style="background:#ccffcc;" | Port Adelaide
| style="background:#ccffcc;" |6.5 (41)
| Adelaide Oval
| 
| bgcolor="Black" style="color:white" align="center" |Port Adelaide
!9
|- style="background:#fff;"
| 30 July
| 12
|  Norwood
| 3.8 (26)
| style="background:#ccffcc;" | Port Adelaide
| style="background:#ccffcc;" |10.15 (75)
| Adelaide Oval
| 
| bgcolor="Black" style="color:white" align="center" |Port Adelaide
!49
|- style="background:#fff;"
|20/8
| 14
|  Norwood 
| 3.1 (19)
| style="background:#ccffcc;" | Port Adelaide
| style="background:#ccffcc;" |10.14 (74)
| Adelaide Oval
| 
| bgcolor="Black" style="color:white" align="center" |Port Adelaide
!55
|- style="background:#fff;"
|3/9
| bgcolor="#FFFFA6" |SF
| style="background:#ccffcc;" | Port Adelaide
| style="background:#ccffcc;" |4.16 (40)
|  Norwood
| 2.6 (18)
| Adelaide Oval
|
| bgcolor="Black" style="color:white" align="center" |Port Adelaide
!22
|- style="background:#fff;"
| rowspan="3" style="text-align: center;" div |1899
| 29 May
| 4
| style="background:#ccffcc;" | Norwood
| style="background:#ccffcc;" |6.3 (39)
|  Port Adelaide
| 3.6 (24)
| Adelaide Oval
| 4,000
| bgcolor="Navy" style="color:red" align="center" | Norwood
!15
|- style="background:#fff;"
| 15 July
| 11
| style="background:#ccffcc;" | Norwood
| style="background:#ccffcc;" |5.6 (36)
|  Port Adelaide
| 4.7 (31)
| Adelaide Oval
| 
| bgcolor="Navy" style="color:red" align="center" | Norwood
!5
|- style="background:#fff;"
|5/8
| 14
| style="background:#ccffcc;" |  Norwood
| style="background:#ccffcc;" |5.5 (35)
|  Port Adelaide
| 3.7 (25)
| Adelaide Oval
| 
| bgcolor="Navy" style="color:red" align="center" | Norwood
!10
|- style="background:#fff;"
| rowspan="4" style="text-align: center;" div |1900
| 28 May
| 5
| style="background:#ccffcc;" | Norwood
| style="background:#ccffcc;" |9.5 (59)
|  Port Adelaide
| 5.5 (35)
| Adelaide Oval
| 
| bgcolor="Navy" style="color:red" align="center" | Norwood
!24
|- style="background:#fff;"
| 23 June
| 9
| style="background:#ccffcc;" | Norwood
| style="background:#ccffcc;" |4.10 (34)
|  Port Adelaide
| 1.2 (8)
| Adelaide Oval
| 
| bgcolor="Navy" style="color:red" align="center" | Norwood
!26
|- style="background:#fff;"
| 7 July
| 12
| style="background:#ccffcc;" |  Norwood
| style="background:#ccffcc;" |3.11 (29)
|  Port Adelaide
| 3.5 (23)
| Adelaide Oval
| 
| bgcolor="Navy" style="color:red" align="center" | Norwood
!6
|- style="background:#fff;"
|18/8
| 17
| style="background:#ccffcc;" |  Norwood
| style="background:#ccffcc;" |3.4 (22)
|  Port Adelaide
| 3.2 (20)
| Adelaide Oval
| 
| bgcolor="Navy" style="color:red" align="center" | Norwood
!2
|- style="background:#fff;"
| rowspan="4" bgcolor="navy" style="text-align: center;" div |1901
| 25 May
| 4
| style="background:#ccffcc;" | Norwood
| style="background:#ccffcc;" |8.11 (59)
|  Port Adelaide
| 2.11 (23)
| Norwood Oval
| 1,000
| bgcolor="Navy" style="color:red" align="center" | Norwood
!36
|- style="background:#fff;"
| 13 July
| 11
| style="background:#ccffcc;" | Norwood
| style="background:#ccffcc;" |6.7 (43)
|  Port Adelaide
| 5.3 (33)
| Adelaide Oval
| 
| bgcolor="Navy" style="color:red" align="center" | Norwood
!10
|- style="background:#fff;"
|14/9
|20
| style="background:#ccffcc;" | Port Adelaide
| style="background:#ccffcc;" |8.13 (61)
|  Norwood
| 1.5 (11)
| Alberton Oval
| 
| bgcolor="black" style="color:white" align="center" | Port Adelaide
!50
|- style="background:#fff;"
|12/10
| bgcolor="gold" |GF
| style="background:#ccffcc;" | Norwood
| style="background:#ccffcc;" |4.9 (33)
|  Port Adelaide
| 4.5 (29)
| Adelaide Oval
| 7,000
| bgcolor="Navy" style="color:red" align="center" | Norwood
!4
|- style="background:#fff;"
| rowspan="2" style="text-align: center;" div |1902
| 9 June
| 7
|  Norwood
| 6.8 (44)
| style="background:#ccffcc;" | Port Adelaide
| style="background:#ccffcc;" |7.8 (50)
| Adelaide Oval
| 
| bgcolor="black" style="color:white" align="center" | Port Adelaide
!6
|- style="background:#fff;"
|23/8
| 15
|  Norwood
| 2.5 (17)
| style="background:#ccffcc;" | Port Adelaide
| style="background:#ccffcc;" |7.6 (48)
| Norwood Oval
| 
| bgcolor="black" style="color:white" align="center" | Port Adelaide
!31
|- style="background:#fff;"
| rowspan="3" bgcolor="black" style="text-align: center;" div |1903
| 30 May
| 5
| style="background:#ccffcc;" | Port Adelaide
| style="background:#ccffcc;" |9.13 (67)
|  Norwood
| 2.8 (20)
| Alberton Oval
| 
| bgcolor="black" style="color:white" align="center" | Port Adelaide
!47
|- style="background:#fff;"
|8/8
| 12
|  Norwood
| 3.9 (27)
| style="background:#ccffcc;" | Port Adelaide
| style="background:#ccffcc;" |6.6 (42)
| Adelaide Oval
| 
| bgcolor="black" style="color:white" align="center" | Port Adelaide
!15
|- style="background:#fff;"
|1/9
| bgcolor="#FFFFA6" |SF
| style="background:#ccffcc;" | Port Adelaide
| style="background:#ccffcc;" |7.9 (51)
|  Norwood
| 4.11 (35)
| Adelaide Oval
| 11,000
| bgcolor="black" style="color:white" align="center" | Port Adelaide
!16
|- style="background:#fff;"
| rowspan="3" bgcolor="navy" style="text-align: center;" div |1904
| 21 May
| 3
|  Port Adelaide
| 5.7 (37)
|  Norwood
| 5.7 (37)
| Alberton Oval
| 
| align="center" | Draw
!
|- style="background:#fff;"
| 23 July
| 10
|  Norwood
| 5.12 (42)
| style="background:#ccffcc;" | Port Adelaide
| style="background:#ccffcc;" |7.6 (48)
| Norwood Oval
| 
| bgcolor="black" style="color:white" align="center" | Port Adelaide
!6
|- style="background:#fff;"
|17/9
| bgcolor="gold" |GF
| style="background:#ccffcc;" | Norwood
| style="background:#ccffcc;" |9.8 (62)
|  Port Adelaide
| 8.10 (58)
| Adelaide Oval
| 15,000
| bgcolor="Navy" style="color:red" align="center" | Norwood
!4
|- style="background:#fff;"
| rowspan="2" style="text-align: center;" |1905
| 5 June
|  5
| style="background:#ccffcc;" | Norwood
| style="background:#ccffcc;" |6.12 (48)
|  Port Adelaide
| 4.8 (32)
| Adelaide Oval
| 12,000
| bgcolor="Navy" style="color:red" align="center" | Norwood
!16
|- style="background:#fff;"
|12/8
| 12
| style="background:#ccffcc;" | Port Adelaide
| style="background:#ccffcc;" |9.6 (60)
|  Norwood
| 4.4 (28)
| Alberton Oval
| 
| bgcolor="black" style="color:white" align="center" | Port Adelaide
!32
|+
|- style="background:#ccf; text-align: center;"
| colspan="11" |South Australian Football League
|- style="background:#fff;"
| rowspan="2" bgcolor="black" style="text-align: center;" div |1906
| 19 May
| 3
|  Norwood
| 3.9 (27)
| style="background:#ccffcc;" | Port Adelaide
| style="background:#ccffcc;" |7.5 (47)
| Alberton Oval
| 7,500
| bgcolor="black" style="color:white" align="center" | Port Adelaide
!20
|- style="background:#fff;"
| 27 July
| 11
| style="background:#ccffcc;" | Norwood
| style="background:#ccffcc;" |11.13 (79)
|  Port Adelaide
| 7.9 (51)
| Adelaide Oval
| 
| bgcolor="Navy" style="color:red" align="center" | Norwood
!28
|- style="background:#fff;"
| rowspan="4" bgcolor="navy" style="text-align: center;" div |1907
| 11 May
| 2
| style="background:#ccffcc;" | Port Adelaide
| style="background:#ccffcc;" |5.14 (44)
|  Norwood
| 4.7 (31)
| Alberton Oval
| 6,500
| bgcolor="Black" style="color:white" align="center" | Port Adelaide
!13
|- style="background:#fff;"
|20/7
| 10
|  Norwood
| 5.4 (34)
| style="background:#ccffcc;" | Port Adelaide
| style="background:#ccffcc;" |6.12 (48)
| Adelaide Oval
| 20,000
| bgcolor="Black" style="color:white" align="center" | Port Adelaide
!14
|- style="background:#fff;"
|14/9
| bgcolor="#FFFFA6" |SF
| style="background:#ccffcc;" | Norwood
| style="background:#ccffcc;" |7.14 (56)
|  Port Adelaide
| 6.6 (42)
| Adelaide Oval
| 20,000
| bgcolor="Navy" style="color:red" align="center" | Norwood
!14
|- style="background:#fff;"
|21/9
| bgcolor="gold" |GF
| style="background:#ccffcc;" | Norwood
| style="background:#ccffcc;" |8.7 (55)
|  Port Adelaide
| 3.9 (27)
| Adelaide Oval
| 25,000
| bgcolor="Navy" style="color:red" align="center" | Norwood
!28
|- style="background:#fff;"
| rowspan="3" style="text-align: center;" |1908
|8 June
|6
| style="background:#ccffcc;" | Norwood
| style="background:#ccffcc;" |4.5 (39)
| Port Adelaide
|3.9 (27)
|Adelaide Oval
|22,000
| bgcolor="Navy" style="color:red" align="center" |Norwood
!12
|- style="background:#fff;"
|1/8
|13
| style="background:#ccffcc;" | Norwood
| style="background:#ccffcc;" |10.11 (71)
| Port Adelaide
|7.8 (50)
|Norwood Oval
|15,000
| bgcolor="Navy" style="color:red" align="center" |Norwood
!21
|- style="background:#fff;"
|12/9
| bgcolor="#FFFFA6" |SF
| style="background:#ccffcc;" |  Norwood
| style="background:#ccffcc;" | 11.12 (78)
|  Port Adelaide
| 6.4 (40)
| Adelaide Oval
| 20,000
| bgcolor="Navy" style="color:red" align="center" | Norwood
!38
|- style="background:#fff;"
| rowspan="3" style="text-align: center;" |1909
|15 May
|3
| style="background:#ccffcc;" | Port Adelaide
| style="background:#ccffcc;" |1.4 (10)
| Norwood
|0.5 (5)
|Alberton Oval
|4,500
| bgcolor="Black" style="color:white" align="center" | Port Adelaide
!5
|- style="background:#fff;"
|24 July
|11
| Norwood
|3.6 (24)
| style="background:#ccffcc;" | Port Adelaide
| style="background:#ccffcc;" |9.7 (61)
|Adelaide Oval
|8,000
| bgcolor="Black" style="color:white" align="center" | Port Adelaide
!37
|- style="background:#fff;"
|4/9
| bgcolor="#FFFFA6" |SF
| style="background:#ccffcc;" | Norwood
| style="background:#ccffcc;" |11.12 (78)
|  Port Adelaide
| 3.10 (28)
| Adelaide Oval
| 22,000
| bgcolor="Navy" style="color:red" align="center" | Norwood
!50
|- style="background:#fff;"
| rowspan="2" bgcolor="black" style="text-align: center;" div |1910
|27 June
|7
| Norwood
|6.11 (47)
| style="background:#ccffcc;" | Port Adelaide
| style="background:#ccffcc;" |10.7 (67)
|Adelaide Oval
|15,000
| bgcolor="Black" style="color:white" align="center" | Port Adelaide
!20
|- style="background:#fff;"
|27/8
|14
| Norwood
|9.9 (63)
| style="background:#ccffcc;" | Port Adelaide
| style="background:#ccffcc;" |10.7 (67)
|Norwood Oval
|12,000
| bgcolor="Black" style="color:white" align="center" | Port Adelaide
!4
|- style="background:#fff;"
| rowspan="2" style="text-align: center;" |1911
|27 May
|4
| Norwood
|3.13 (31)
| style="background:#ccffcc;" | Port Adelaide
| style="background:#ccffcc;" |8.14 (62)
|Norwood Oval
|
| bgcolor="Black" style="color:white" align="center" | Port Adelaide
!31
|- style="background:#fff;"
|22 July
|10
| style="background:#ccffcc;" | Port Adelaide
| style="background:#ccffcc;" |16.21 (117)
| Norwood
|6.4 (40)
|Alberton Oval
|
| bgcolor="Black" style="color:white" align="center" | Port Adelaide
!27
|- style="background:#fff;"
| rowspan="2" style="text-align: center;" |1912
|25 May
|4
| Norwood
|4.9 (33)
| style="background:#ccffcc;" | Port Adelaide
| style="background:#ccffcc;" |10.21 (81)
|Norwood Oval
|
| bgcolor="Black" style="color:white" align="center" | Port Adelaide
!48
|- style="background:#fff;"
|29 June
|9
| style="background:#ccffcc;" | Port Adelaide
| style="background:#ccffcc;" |8.7 (55)
| Norwood
|5.10 (40)
|Alberton Oval
|
| bgcolor="Black" style="color:white" align="center" | Port Adelaide
!15
|- style="background:#fff;"
| rowspan="2" bgcolor="black" style="text-align: center;" div |1913
|17 May
|3
| style="background:#ccffcc;" | Port Adelaide
| style="background:#ccffcc;" |10.11 (71)
| Norwood
|5.2 (32)
|Alberton Oval
|
| bgcolor="Black" style="color:white" align="center" | Port Adelaide
!39
|- style="background:#fff;"
|21 June
|8
| Norwood
|7.9 (51)
| style="background:#ccffcc;" | Port Adelaide
| style="background:#ccffcc;" |13.9 (87)
|Adelaide Oval
|
| bgcolor="Black" style="color:white" align="center" | Port Adelaide
!36
|- style="background:#fff;"
| rowspan="2" bgcolor="black" style="text-align: center;" div |1914
|30 May
|5
| Norwood
|8.5 (53)
| style="background:#ccffcc;" | Port Adelaide
| style="background:#ccffcc;" |13.13 (91)
|Adelaide Oval
|9,000
| bgcolor="Black" style="color:white" align="center" | Port Adelaide
!38
|- style="background:#fff;"
|18 July
|12
| style="background:#ccffcc;" | Port Adelaide
| style="background:#ccffcc;" |19.17 (131)
| Norwood
|7.8 (50)
|Alberton Oval
|
| bgcolor="Black" style="color:white" align="center" | Port Adelaide
!81
|- style="background:#fff;"
| rowspan="2" style="text-align: center;" |1915
|12 June
|6
| Norwood
|6.5 (41)
| style="background:#ccffcc;" | Port Adelaide
| style="background:#ccffcc;" |10.18 (78)
|Norwood Oval
|2,000
| bgcolor="Black" style="color:white" align="center" | Port Adelaide
!37
|- style="background:#fff;"
|14/6
|13
| style="background:#ccffcc;" | Port Adelaide
| style="background:#ccffcc;" |11.15 (81)
| Norwood
|2.8 (20)
|Alberton Oval
|
| bgcolor="Black" style="color:white" align="center" | Port Adelaide
!61
|- style="background:#fff;"
| rowspan="2" style="text-align: center;" |1919
|14 June
|7
| Norwood
|5.8 (38)
| style="background:#ccffcc;" | Port Adelaide
| style="background:#ccffcc;" |15.18 (108)
|Norwood Oval
|
| bgcolor="Black" style="color:white" align="center" | Port Adelaide
!70
|- style="background:#fff;"
|16/8
|14
| style="background:#ccffcc;" | Port Adelaide
| style="background:#ccffcc;" |10.14 (74)
| Norwood
|6.9 (45)
|Alberton Oval
|
| bgcolor="Black" style="color:white" align="center" | Port Adelaide
!29
|- style="background:#fff;"
| rowspan="3" style="text-align: center;" |1920 
|1 May
|1
| style="background:#ccffcc;" | Norwood
| style="background:#ccffcc;" |11.12 (78)
| Port Adelaide
|7.10 (52)
|Norwood Oval
|
| bgcolor="navy" style="color:red" align="center" | Norwood
!26
|- style="background:#fff;"
|10 July
|10
| style="background:#ccffcc;" | Port Adelaide
| style="background:#ccffcc;" |7.13 (55)
| Norwood
|5.6 (36)
|Alberton Oval
|
| bgcolor="Black" style="color:white" align="center" | Port Adelaide
!19
|- style="background:#fff;"
|11/9
| bgcolor="#FFFFA6" |SF
| style="background:#ccffcc;" | Norwood
| style="background:#ccffcc;" |9.9 (63)
|Port Adelaide
|5.11 (41)
|Adelaide Oval
|20,000
| bgcolor="navy" style="color:red" align="center" | Norwood
!22
|- style="background:#fff;"
| rowspan="4" bgcolor="black" style="text-align: center;" div |1921
|9 May
|1
| style="background:#ccffcc;" | Norwood
| style="background:#ccffcc;" |9.7 (61)
|Port Adelaide
|5.11 (41)
|Norwood Oval
|
| bgcolor="navy" style="color:red" align="center" | Norwood
!20
|- style="background:#fff;"
|2 July
|9
| style="background:#ccffcc;" |Port Adelaide
| style="background:#ccffcc;" |12.14 (86)
| Norwood
|5.16 (46)
|Alberton Oval
|
| bgcolor="Black" style="color:white" align="center" | Port Adelaide
!46
|- style="background:#fff;"
|2/10
| bgcolor="#FFFFA6" |SF
|  Port Adelaide
| 10.6 (66)
|  Norwood
| 10.6 (66)
| Adelaide Oval
| 24,000
| align="center" | Draw
!
|- style="background:#fff;"
|8/10
| bgcolor="gold" |GF
| style="background:#ccffcc;" | Port Adelaide
| style="background:#ccffcc;" |4.8 (32)
|  Norwood
| 3.6 (24)
| Adelaide Oval
| 34,800
| bgcolor="Black" style="color:white" align="center" | Port Adelaide
!8
|- style="background:#fff;"
| rowspan="2" bgcolor="navy" style="text-align: center;" div |1922
|5 June
|5
| style="background:#ccffcc;" | Norwood
| style="background:#ccffcc;" |17.11 (113)
| Port Adelaide
|4.6 (30)
|Adelaide Oval
|
| bgcolor="navy" style="color:red" align="center" |Norwood
!83
|- style="background:#fff;"
|2/9
|14
| Port Adelaide
|9.12 (66)
| style="background:#ccffcc;" | Norwood
| style="background:#ccffcc;" |9.14 (68)
|Alberton Oval
|
| bgcolor="navy" style="color:red" align="center" |Norwood
!2
|- style="background:#fff;"
| rowspan="2" bgcolor="navy" style="text-align: center;" div |1923
|19 May
|3
| style="background:#ccffcc;" | Norwood
| style="background:#ccffcc;" |12.16 (88)
| Port Adelaide
|7.8 (50)
|Norwood Oval
|
| bgcolor="navy" style="color:red" align="center" |Norwood
!38
|- style="background:#fff;"
|11/8
|12
| style="background:#ccffcc;" | Port Adelaide
| style="background:#ccffcc;" |18.8 (116)
| Norwood
|8.7 (55)
|Alberton Oval
|10,000
| bgcolor="Black" style="color:white" align="center" | Port Adelaide
!61
|- style="background:#fff;"
| rowspan="2" style="text-align: center;" |1924
|10 May
|2
| Norwood
|7.15 (57)
| style="background:#ccffcc;" | Port Adelaide
| style="background:#ccffcc;" |9.12 (66)
|Norwood Oval
|
| bgcolor="Black" style="color:white" align="center" | Port Adelaide
!9
|- style="background:#fff;"
|28 June
|9
| style="background:#ccffcc;" | Port Adelaide
| style="background:#ccffcc;" |10.18 (78)
| Norwood
|10.10 (70)
|Alberton Oval
|
| bgcolor="Black" style="color:white" align="center" | Port Adelaide
!8
|- style="background:#fff;"
| rowspan="2" bgcolor="navy" style="text-align: center;" div |1925
|13 June
|7
| style="background:#ccffcc;" | Port Adelaide
| style="background:#ccffcc;" |11.14 (80)
| Norwood
|10.10 (70)
|Alberton Oval
|
| bgcolor="Black" style="color:white" align="center" | Port Adelaide
!10
|- style="background:#fff;"
|5/9
|14
| style="background:#ccffcc;" | Norwood
| style="background:#ccffcc;" |12.13 (85)
| Port Adelaide
|8.8 (56)
|Norwood Oval
|
| bgcolor="navy" style="color:red" align="center" |Norwood
!29
|- style="background:#fff;"
| rowspan="2" style="text-align: center;" |1926
|29 May
|5
| Norwood
|9.10 (64)
| style="background:#ccffcc;" | Port Adelaide
| style="background:#ccffcc;" |8.18 (66)
|Norwood Oval
|
| bgcolor="Black" style="color:white" align="center" | Port Adelaide
!2
|- style="background:#fff;"
|14/8
|13
| style="background:#ccffcc;" | Port Adelaide
| style="background:#ccffcc;" |17.15 (117)
| Norwood
|11.8 (74)
|Alberton Oval
|
| bgcolor="Black" style="color:white" align="center" | Port Adelaide
!43
|+
|- style="background:#ccf; text-align: center;"
| colspan="11" |South Australian National Football League
|- style="background:#fff;"
| rowspan="2" style="text-align: center;" |1927
|28 May
|5
| style="background:#ccffcc;" | Port Adelaide
| style="background:#ccffcc;" |16.14 (110)
| Norwood
|10.9 (69)
|Alberton Oval
|
| bgcolor="Black" style="color:white" align="center" | Port Adelaide
!41
|- style="background:#fff;"
|27/8
|16
| style="background:#ccffcc;" | Norwood
| style="background:#ccffcc;" |12.10 (82)
| Port Adelaide
|10.4 (74)
|Norwood Oval
|
| bgcolor="navy" style="color:red" align="center" |Norwood
!8
|- style="background:#fff;"
| rowspan="5" bgcolor="black" style="text-align: center;" div |1928
|5 May
|2
| style="background:#ccffcc;" | Port Adelaide
| style="background:#ccffcc;" |10.6 (66)
| Norwood
|8.12 (60)
|Alberton Oval
|
| bgcolor="Black" style="color:white" align="center" | Port Adelaide
!6
|- style="background:#fff;"
|7 July
|10
| style="background:#ccffcc;" | Norwood
| style="background:#ccffcc;" |9.15 (69)
| Port Adelaide
|8.14 (62)
|Norwood Oval
|
| bgcolor="navy" style="color:red" align="center" |Norwood
!7
|- style="background:#fff;"
|25 August
| 
| style="background:#ccffcc;" | Norwood
| style="background:#ccffcc;" |
|  Port Adelaide
| 
| Sydney Showground
| 12,500
| bgcolor="navy" style="color:red" align="center" |Norwood
!5
|- style="background:#fff;"
|22 September
| bgcolor="#FFFFA6" |SF
| style="background:#ccffcc;" | Norwood
| style="background:#ccffcc;" |8.13 (61)
|  Port Adelaide
| 3.2 (20)
| Adelaide Oval
| 24,800
| bgcolor="navy" style="color:red" align="center" |Norwood
!28
|- style="background:#fff;"
|6/10
| bgcolor="gold" |GF
| style="background:#ccffcc;" | Port Adelaide
| style="background:#ccffcc;" |15.14 (104)
|  Norwood
| 7.14 (56)
| Adelaide Oval
| 35,700
| bgcolor="Black" style="color:white" align="center" | Port Adelaide
!48
|- style="background:#fff;"
| rowspan="3" bgcolor="navy" style="text-align: center;" div |1929
|11 May
|3
| style="background:#ccffcc;" | Port Adelaide
| style="background:#ccffcc;" |13.17 (95)
| Norwood
|9.8 (62)
|Alberton Oval
|
| bgcolor="Black" style="color:white" align="center" | Port Adelaide
!33
|- style="background:#fff;"
|7/9
|17
| style="background:#ccffcc;" | Norwood
| style="background:#ccffcc;" |9.11 (65)
| Port Adelaide
|8.12 (60)
|Norwood Oval
|
| bgcolor="navy" style="color:red" align="center" |Norwood
!5
|- style="background:#fff;"
|5/10
| bgcolor="gold" |GF
| style="background:#ccffcc;" | Norwood
| style="background:#ccffcc;" |16.14 (110)
|  Port Adelaide
| 10.9 (69)
| Adelaide Oval
| 35,504
| bgcolor="Navy" style="color:red" align="center" |Norwood
!41
|- style="background:#fff;"
| rowspan="3" style="text-align: center;" |1930
|14 June
|8
| Norwood
|14.19 (103)
| Port Adelaide
|15.13 (103)
|Norwood Oval
|
| bgcolor="white" align="center" |Draw
!
|- style="background:#fff;"
|6/9
|17
| style="background:#ccffcc;" | Port Adelaide
| style="background:#ccffcc;" |16.12 (108)
| Norwood
|15.17 (107)
|Alberton Oval
|
| bgcolor="Black" style="color:white" align="center" | Port Adelaide
!1
|- style="background:#fff;"
|13/9
| bgcolor="#FFFFA6" |SF
| style="background:#ccffcc;" | Port Adelaide
| style="background:#ccffcc;" |7.11 (53)
| Norwood
|6.14 (50)
|Adelaide Oval
|18,153
| bgcolor="Black" style="color:white" align="center" | Port Adelaide
!3
|- style="background:#fff;"
| rowspan="2" style="text-align: center;" |1931
|16 May
|3
| Port Adelaide
|23.20 (158)
| Norwood
|8.9 (57)
|Alberton Oval
|6,080
| bgcolor="Black" style="color:white" align="center" | Port Adelaide
!101
|- style="background:#fff;"
|11 July
|10
| style="background:#ccffcc;" | Norwood
| style="background:#ccffcc;" |10.13 (73)
| Port Adelaide
|8.6 (54)
|Norwood Oval
|3,726
| bgcolor="Navy" style="color:red" align="center" |Norwood
!19
|- style="background:#fff;"
| rowspan="2" style="text-align: center;" |1932
|7 May
|2
| Norwood
|8.15 (63)
| style="background:#ccffcc;" | Port Adelaide
| style="background:#ccffcc;" |11.8 (74)
|Norwood Oval
|7,566
| bgcolor="Black" style="color:white" align="center" | Port Adelaide
!11
|- style="background:#fff;"
|2 July
|9
| style="background:#ccffcc;" | Port Adelaide
| style="background:#ccffcc;" |10.15 (75)
| Norwood
|7.7 (49)
|Alberton Oval
|5,760
| bgcolor="Black" style="color:white" align="center" | Port Adelaide
!26
|- style="background:#fff;"
| rowspan="2" style="text-align: center;" |1933
|6 May
|2
| Norwood
|10.9 (69)
| Port Adelaide
|9.15 (69)
|Adelaide Oval
|6,063
| bgcolor="white" style="color:black" align="center" | Draw
!
|- style="background:#fff;"
|24 June
|9
| Norwood
|13.9 (87)
| style="background:#ccffcc;" | Port Adelaide
| style="background:#ccffcc;" |13.18 (96)
|Norwood Oval
|6,600
| bgcolor="Black" style="color:white" align="center" | Port Adelaide
!9
|- style="background:#fff;"
| rowspan="2" style="text-align: center;" |1934
|19 May
|4
| style="background:#ccffcc;" | Norwood
| style="background:#ccffcc;" |15.25 (115)
| Port Adelaide
|12.12 (84)
|Norwood Oval
|
| bgcolor="Navy" style="color:red" align="center" |Norwood
!31
|- style="background:#fff;"
|21 July
|11
| style="background:#ccffcc;" | Port Adelaide
| style="background:#ccffcc;" |18.11 (119)
| Norwood
|10.14 (74)
|Alberton Oval
|
| bgcolor="Black" style="color:white" align="center" | Port Adelaide
!45
|- style="background:#fff;"
| rowspan="2" style="text-align: center;" |1935
|18 May
|4
| style="background:#ccffcc;" | Norwood
| style="background:#ccffcc;" |18.14 (122)
| Port Adelaide
|17.9 (111)
|Norwood Oval
|10,100
| bgcolor="Navy" style="color:red" align="center" |Norwood
!11
|- style="background:#fff;"
|13 July
|11
| style="background:#ccffcc;" | Port Adelaide
| style="background:#ccffcc;" |20.12 (132)
| Norwood
|8.16 (64)
|Alberton Oval
|6,100
| bgcolor="Black" style="color:white" align="center" | Port Adelaide
!68
|- style="background:#fff;"
| rowspan="2" bgcolor="black" style="text-align: center;" div |1936
|29 June
|9
| Norwood
|15.16 (106)
| style="background:#ccffcc;" | Port Adelaide
| style="background:#ccffcc;" |18.11 (119)
|Adelaide Oval
|29,000
| bgcolor="Black" style="color:white" align="center" | Port Adelaide
!13
|- style="background:#fff;"
|5/
|17
| Norwood
|18.19 (127)
| style="background:#ccffcc;" | Port Adelaide
| style="background:#ccffcc;" |21.11 (143)
|Norwood Oval
|10,900
| bgcolor="Black" style="color:white" align="center" | Port Adelaide
!16
|- style="background:#fff;"
| rowspan="4" bgcolor="black" style="text-align: center;" div |1937
|12 May
|4
| Norwood
|8.15 (63)
| style="background:#ccffcc;" | Port Adelaide
| style="background:#ccffcc;" |9.14 (68)
|Adelaide Oval
|23,000
| bgcolor="Black" style="color:white" align="center" | Port Adelaide
!5
|- style="background:#fff;"
|26 June
|10
| Norwood
|17.18 (120)
| style="background:#ccffcc;" | Port Adelaide
| style="background:#ccffcc;" |20.15 (135)
|Norwood Oval
|17,700
| bgcolor="Black" style="color:white" align="center" | Port Adelaide
!10
|- style="background:#fff;"
|4/9
|17
| style="background:#ccffcc;" | Port Adelaide
| style="background:#ccffcc;" |16.20 (116)
| Norwood
|14.7 (91)
|Alberton Oval
|10,846
| bgcolor="Black" style="color:white" align="center" | Port Adelaide
!25
|- style="background:#fff;"
|18/9
| bgcolor="#FFFFA6" |SF
| style="background:#ccffcc;" | Port Adelaide
| style="background:#ccffcc;" |17.21 (123)
| Norwood
|9.6 (60)
|Adelaide Oval
|22,891
| bgcolor="Black" style="color:white" align="center" |Port Adelaide
!63
|- style="background:#fff;"
| rowspan="4" style="text-align: center;" |1938
|13 June
|8
| style="background:#ccffcc;" | Norwood
| style="background:#ccffcc;" |19.11 (125)
| Port Adelaide
|13.16 (94)
|Adelaide Oval
|27,746
| bgcolor="Navy" style="color:red" align="center" |Norwood
!31
|- style="background:#fff;"
|6/8
|14
| Port Adelaide
|11.14 (80)
| style="background:#ccffcc;" | Norwood
| style="background:#ccffcc;" |12.9 (81)
|Alberton Oval
|5,000
| bgcolor="Navy" style="color:red" align="center" |Norwood
!1
|- style="background:#fff;"
|3/9
|17
| style="background:#ccffcc;" | Norwood
| style="background:#ccffcc;" |18.19 (127)
| Port Adelaide
|12.14 (86)
|Norwood Oval
|8,000
| bgcolor="Navy" style="color:red" align="center" |Norwood
!41
|- style="background:#fff;"
|24/9
| bgcolor="#FFFFA6" |PF
| style="background:#ccffcc;" | Port Adelaide
| style="background:#ccffcc;" |19.25 (139)
| Norwood
|12.13 (85)
|Adelaide Oval
|26,047
| bgcolor="Black" style="color:white" align="center" | Port Adelaide
!54
|- style="background:#fff;"
| rowspan="2" bgcolor="black" style="text-align: center;" div |1939
|6 May
|3
| style="background:#ccffcc;" | Norwood
| style="background:#ccffcc;" |15.17 (107)
| Port Adelaide
|14.15 (99)
|Norwood Oval
|13,000
| bgcolor="Navy" style="color:red" align="center" |Norwood
!8
|- style="background:#fff;"
|8 July
|10
| style="background:#ccffcc;" | Port Adelaide
| style="background:#ccffcc;" |17.21 (123)
| Norwood
|13.16 (94)
|Alberton Oval
|9,010
| bgcolor="Black" style="color:white" align="center" | Port Adelaide
!29
|- style="background:#fff;"
| rowspan="2" style="text-align: center;" |1940
|18 May
|5
| Norwood
|13.17 (95)
| style="background:#ccffcc;" | Port Adelaide
| style="background:#ccffcc;" |17.21 (123)
|Norwood Oval
|12,000
| bgcolor="Black" style="color:white" align="center" |Port Adelaide
!28
|- style="background:#fff;"
|20 July
|13
| style="background:#ccffcc;" | Port Adelaide
| style="background:#ccffcc;" |14.11 (95)
| Norwood
|13.10 (88)
|Alberton Oval
|5,600
| bgcolor="Black" style="color:white" align="center" |Port Adelaide
!7
|- style="background:#fff;"
| rowspan="2" style="text-align: center;" |1941
|3 May
|2
| Port Adelaide
|12.17 (89)
| style="background:#ccffcc;" | Norwood
| style="background:#ccffcc;" |22.21 (153)
|Alberton Oval
|
| bgcolor="Navy" style="color:red" align="center" |Norwood
!64
|- style="background:#fff;"
|21 June
|9
| Norwood
|14.17 (101)
| style="background:#ccffcc;" | Port Adelaide
| style="background:#ccffcc;" |18.20 (128)
|Norwood Oval
|
| bgcolor="Black" style="color:white" align="center" |Port Adelaide
!27
|- style="background:#fff;"
| rowspan="3" bgcolor="black" style="text-align: center;" div |1942
|23 May
|2
| Norwood-NthA
|14.13 (97)
| style="background:#ccffcc;" | Port-Torrens
| style="background:#ccffcc;" |16.18 (114)
|Adelaide Oval
|
| bgcolor="black" style="color:white" align="center" |Port Adelaide
!17
|- style="background:#fff;"
|18 July
|5
| style="background:#ccffcc;" |  Norwood-NthA
| style="background:#ccffcc;" |17.11 (113)
| Port-Torrens
|12.7 (89)
|Adelaide Oval
|
| bgcolor="navy" style="color:red" align="center" |Norwood-NthA
!24
|- style="background:#fff;"
|14/8
|8
|  Norwood-NthA
|14.7 (91)
| style="background:#ccffcc;" | Port-Torrens
| style="background:#ccffcc;" |20.14 (134)
|Norwood Oval
|
| bgcolor="black" style="color:white" align="center" |Port-Torrens
!43
|- style="background:#fff;"
| rowspan="4" bgcolor="navy" style="text-align: center;" div |1943
|22 May
|2
| style="background:#ccffcc;" | Port-Torrens
| style="background:#ccffcc;" |16.19 (115)
| Norwood-NthA
|12.12 (84)
|Alberton Oval
|
| bgcolor="Black" style="color:white" align="center" |Port-Torrens
!31
|- style="background:#fff;"
|19 June
|5
| style="background:#ccffcc;" |  Norwood-NthA
| style="background:#ccffcc;" |12.7 (79)
| Port-Torrens
|11.11 (77)
|Adelaide Oval
|
| bgcolor="Navy" style="color:red" align="center" |Norwood-NthA
!2
|- style="background:#fff;"
|24 July
|8
| style="background:#ccffcc;" |  Norwood-NthA
| style="background:#ccffcc;" |13.15 (93)
| Port-Torrens
|9.15 (69)
|Norwood Oval
|
| bgcolor="Navy" style="color:red" align="center" |Norwood-NthA
!24
|- style="background:#fff;"
|30/9
| bgcolor="gold" |GF
| style="background:#ccffcc;" | Norwood-NthA
| style="background:#ccffcc;" |12.10 (82)
| Port-Torrens
|8.13 (61)
|Adelaide Oval
| bgcolor="#FFFFA6" |42,000
| bgcolor="navy" style="color:red" align="center" |Norwood-NthA
!21
|- style="background:#fff;"
| rowspan="4" bgcolor="navy" style="text-align: center;" div |1944
|20 May
|1
|  Norwood-NthA
|18.16 (124)
| style="background:#ccffcc;" | Port-Torrens
| style="background:#ccffcc;" |20.16 (136)
|Adelaide Oval
|
| bgcolor="Black" style="color:white" align="center" |Port-Torrens
!12
|- style="background:#fff;"
|17 June
|4
|  Norwood-NthA
|15.6 (98)
| style="background:#ccffcc;" | Port-Torrens
| style="background:#ccffcc;" |16.21 (117)
|Norwood Oval
|
| bgcolor="Black" style="color:white" align="center" |Port-Torrens
!19
|- style="background:#fff;"
|8 July
|7
|  Norwood-NthA
|17.13 (115)
| style="background:#ccffcc;" | Port-Torrens
| style="background:#ccffcc;" |27.12 (174)
|Adelaide Oval
|
| bgcolor="Black" style="color:white" align="center" |Port-Torrens
!59
|- style="background:#fff;"
|30/9
| bgcolor="gold" |GF
| style="background:#ccffcc;" | Norwood-NthA
| style="background:#ccffcc;" |9.7 (61)
| Port-Torrens
|7.13 (55)
|Adelaide Oval
|30,000
| bgcolor="navy" style="color:red" align="center" |Norwood-NthA
!6
|- style="background:#fff;"
| rowspan="4" style="text-align: center;" |1945
|12 May
|3
| Norwood
|7.5 (47)
| style="background:#ccffcc;" | Port Adelaide
| style="background:#ccffcc;" |10.12 (72)
|Kensington Oval
|
| bgcolor="black" style="color:white" align="center" |Port Adelaide
!25
|- style="background:#fff;"
|23 June
|9
| style="background:#ccffcc;" | Port Adelaide
| style="background:#ccffcc;" |9.18 (72)
| Norwood
|9.8 (62)
|Alberton Oval
|
| bgcolor="black" style="color:white" align="center" |Port Adelaide
!10
|- style="background:#fff;"
|18/8
|15
| Norwood
|11.18 (84)
| style="background:#ccffcc;" | Port Adelaide
| style="background:#ccffcc;" |14.12 (96)
|Norwood Oval
|
| bgcolor="black" style="color:white" align="center" |Port Adelaide
!12
|- style="background:#fff;"
|15/9
| bgcolor="#FFFFA6" |SF
| style="background:#ccffcc;" | Port Adelaide
| style="background:#ccffcc;" |16.14 (110)
| Norwood
|13.8 (86)
|Adelaide Oval
|36,383
| bgcolor="black" style="color:white" align="center" |Port Adelaide
!34
|- style="background:#fff;"
| rowspan="4" bgcolor="navy" style="text-align: center;" div |1946
|11 May
|2
| style="background:#ccffcc;" | Port Adelaide
| style="background:#ccffcc;" |11.8 (74)
| Norwood
|10.12 (72)
|Alberton Oval
|
| bgcolor="black" style="color:white" align="center" |Port Adelaide
!2
|- style="background:#fff;"
|20 July
|12
| style="background:#ccffcc;" | Norwood
| style="background:#ccffcc;" |13.15 (93)
| Port Adelaide
|6.9 (45)
|Norwood Oval
|
| bgcolor="navy" style="color:red" align="center" |Norwood
!48
|- style="background:#fff;"
|21/9
| bgcolor="#FFFFA6" |SF
|  Port Adelaide
| 10.17 (77)
| style="background:#ccffcc;" |  Norwood
| style="background:#ccffcc;" | 14.19 (103)
| Adelaide Oval
|34,603
| bgcolor="Navy" style="color:red" align="center" |Norwood
!26
|- style="background:#fff;"
|5/10
| bgcolor="gold" |GF
| style="background:#ccffcc;" |  Norwood
| style="background:#ccffcc;" | 13.14 (92)
|  Port Adelaide
| 9.10 (64)
| Adelaide Oval
| bgcolor="#FFFFA6" |53,473
| bgcolor="Navy" style="color:red" align="center" |Norwood
!28
|- style="background:#fff;"
| rowspan="3" style="text-align: center;" |1947
|26 April
|1
| style="background:#ccffcc;" | Port Adelaide
| style="background:#ccffcc;" |15.13 (103)
| Norwood
|13.9 (87)
|Alberton Oval
|12,750
| bgcolor="black" style="color:white" align="center" |Port Adelaide
!16
|- style="background:#fff;"
|21 June
|9
| style="background:#ccffcc;" | Norwood
| style="background:#ccffcc;" |15.17 (107)
| Port Adelaide
|13.17 (95)
|Norwood Oval
|20,186
| bgcolor="navy" style="color:red" align="center" |Norwood
!12
|- style="background:#fff;"
|20/9
| bgcolor="#FFFFA6" |SF
| style="background:#ccffcc;" | Norwood
| style="background:#ccffcc;" |14.11 (95)
| Port Adelaide
|13.14 (92)
|Adelaide Oval
|39,665
| bgcolor="navy" style="color:red" align="center" |Norwood
!3
|- style="background:#fff;"
| rowspan="2" bgcolor="navy" style="text-align: center;" div |1948
|1 May
|2
| style="background:#ccffcc;" | Norwood
| style="background:#ccffcc;" |14.9 (93)
| Port Adelaide
|10.23 (83)
|Norwood Oval
|10,800
| bgcolor="navy" style="color:red" align="center" |Norwood
!10
|- style="background:#fff;"
|10 July
|10
| Port Adelaide
|11.12 (78)
| style="background:#ccffcc;" | Norwood
| style="background:#ccffcc;" |15.10 (100)
|Alberton Oval
|
| bgcolor="navy" style="color:red" align="center" |Norwood
!22
|- style="background:#fff;"
| rowspan="3" style="text-align: center;" |1949
|28 May
|6
| Norwood
|10.10 (70)
| style="background:#ccffcc;" | Port Adelaide
| style="background:#ccffcc;" |19.13 (127)
|Kensington Oval
|
| bgcolor="black" style="color:white" align="center" |Port Adelaide
!57
|- style="background:#fff;"
|30 July
|13
| Port Adelaide
|6.21 (57)
| style="background:#ccffcc;" | Norwood
| style="background:#ccffcc;" |11.12 (78)
|Alberton Oval
|
| bgcolor="navy" style="color:red" align="center" |Norwood
!21
|- style="background:#fff;"
|3/9
|17
| style="background:#ccffcc;" | Norwood
| style="background:#ccffcc;" |16.17 (113)
| Port Adelaide
|13.13 (91)
|Norwood Oval
|
| bgcolor="navy" style="color:red" align="center" |Norwood
!22
|- style="background:#fff;"
| rowspan="2" bgcolor="navy" style="text-align: center;" div |1950
|3 June
|7
| style="background:#ccffcc;" | Norwood
| style="background:#ccffcc;" |11.16 (82)
| Port Adelaide
|8.13 (61)
|Norwood Oval
|
| bgcolor="navy" style="color:red" align="center" |Norwood
!21
|- style="background:#fff;"
|12/8
|14
| style="background:#ccffcc;" | Port Adelaide
| style="background:#ccffcc;" |14.12 (96)
| Norwood
|12.15 (87)
|Alberton Oval
|
| bgcolor="black" style="color:white" align="center" |Port Adelaide
!9
|- style="background:#fff;"
| rowspan="3" bgcolor="black" style="text-align: center;" div |1951
|28 April
|2
| Norwood
|7.16 (58)
| style="background:#ccffcc;" | Port Adelaide
| style="background:#ccffcc;" |10.14 (74)
|Norwood Oval
|
| bgcolor="black" style="color:white" align="center" |Port Adelaide
!16
|- style="background:#fff;"
|11 June
|7
| Norwood
|6.11 (47)
| style="background:#ccffcc;" | Port Adelaide
| style="background:#ccffcc;" |8.4 (52)
|Adelaide Oval
|18,000
| bgcolor="black" style="color:white" align="center" |Port Adelaide
!5
|- style="background:#fff;"
|18/8
|16
| style="background:#ccffcc;" | Port Adelaide
| style="background:#ccffcc;" |15.13 (103)
| Norwood
|9.5 (59)
|Alberton Oval
|13,000
| bgcolor="black" style="color:white" align="center" |Port Adelaide
!44
|- style="background:#fff;"
| rowspan="3" |1952
|17 May
|4
| Norwood
|9.5 (59)
| style="background:#ccffcc;" | Port Adelaide
| style="background:#ccffcc;" |9.14 (68)
|Kensington Oval
|
| bgcolor="Black" style="color:white" align="center" |Port Adelaide
!9
|- style="background:#fff;"
|30/8
|16
| style="background:#ccffcc;" | Port Adelaide
| style="background:#ccffcc;" |15.12 (102)
| Norwood
|10.13 (73)
|Alberton Oval
|
| bgcolor="Black" style="color:white" align="center" |Port Adelaide
!29
|- style="background:#fff;"
|27/9
| bgcolor="#FFFFA6" |PF
| Port Adelaide
|6.14 (50)
| style="background:#ccffcc;" | Norwood
| style="background:#ccffcc;" |8.13 (61)
|Adelaide Oval
| bgcolor="#FFFFA6" |42,000
| bgcolor="navy" style="color:red" align="center" |Norwood
!11
|- style="background:#fff;"
| rowspan="2" |1953
|9 May
|3
| Port Adelaide
|10.16 (76)
| style="background:#ccffcc;" | Norwood
| style="background:#ccffcc;" |12.13 (85)
|Alberton Oval
|
| bgcolor="Navy" style="color:red" align="center" |Norwood
!9
|- style="background:#fff;"
|4 July
|11
| Norwood
|11.12 (78)
| style="background:#ccffcc;" | Port Adelaide
| style="background:#ccffcc;" |13.10 (88)
|Norwood Oval
|
| bgcolor="Black" style="color:white" align="center" |Port Adelaide
!10
|- style="background:#fff;"
| rowspan="2" bgcolor="black" style="text-align: center;" div |1954
|29 May
|6
| style="background:#ccffcc;" | Port Adelaide
| style="background:#ccffcc;" |14.10 (94)
| Norwood
|4.13 (37)
|Port Pirie
|7,203
| bgcolor="Black" style="color:white" align="center" |Port Adelaide
!57
|- style="background:#fff;"
|31 July
|13
| Port Adelaide
|12.9 (81)
| style="background:#ccffcc;" | Norwood
| style="background:#ccffcc;" |15.13 (103)
|Alberton Oval
|15,000
| bgcolor="Navy" style="color:red" align="center" |Norwood
!22
|- style="background:#fff;"
| rowspan="4" bgcolor="black" style="text-align: center;" div |1955
|7 May
|3
| style="background:#ccffcc;" | Port Adelaide
| style="background:#ccffcc;" |11.10 (76)
| Norwood
|10.14 (74)
|Alberton Oval
|
| bgcolor="Black" style="color:white" align="center" | Port Adelaide
!2
|- style="background:#fff;"
|2 July
|10
| Norwood
|11.10 (76)
| style="background:#ccffcc;" | Port Adelaide
| style="background:#ccffcc;" |13.16 (94)
|Norwood Oval
|
| bgcolor="Black" style="color:white" align="center" | Port Adelaide
!18
|- style="background:#fff;"
|17/9
| bgcolor="#FFFFA6" |SF
| Port Adelaide
|12.12 (84)
| style="background:#ccffcc;" | Norwood
| style="background:#ccffcc;" |15.18 (108)
|Adelaide Oval
|36,902
| bgcolor="navy" style="color:red" align="center" |Norwood
!24
|- style="background:#fff;"
|1/10
| bgcolor="gold" |GF
| style="background:#ccffcc;" | Port Adelaide
| style="background:#ccffcc;" |15.11 (101)
|  Norwood
| 5.8 (38)
| Adelaide Oval
| bgcolor="#FFFFA6" |44,826
| bgcolor="black" style="color:white" align="center" | Port Adelaide
!63
|- style="background:#fff;"
| rowspan="3" bgcolor="black" style="text-align: center;" div |1956
|25/4
|2
| style="background:#ccffcc;" | Port Adelaide
| style="background:#ccffcc;" |13.18 (96)
| Norwood
|7.15 (57)
|Adelaide Oval
|
| bgcolor="Black" style="color:white" align="center" | Port Adelaide
!39
|- style="background:#fff;"
|2 June
|7
| Norwood
|11.9 (75)
| style="background:#ccffcc;" | Port Adelaide
| style="background:#ccffcc;" |27.22 (184)
|Norwood Oval
|
| bgcolor="Black" style="color:white" align="center" | Port Adelaide
!109
|- style="background:#fff;"
|11/8
|15
| style="background:#ccffcc;" | Port Adelaide
| style="background:#ccffcc;" |13.11 (89)
| Norwood
|7.6 (48)
|Alberton Oval
|
| bgcolor="Black" style="color:white" align="center" | Port Adelaide
!41
|- style="background:#fff;"
| rowspan="4" bgcolor="black" style="text-align: center;" div |1957
|4 May
|3
| style="background:#ccffcc;" | Port Adelaide
| style="background:#ccffcc;" |14.17 (101)
| Norwood
|7.17 (59)
|Kensington Oval
|
| bgcolor="Black" style="color:white" align="center" | Port Adelaide
!42
|- style="background:#fff;"
|29 June
|10
| style="background:#ccffcc;" | Norwood
| style="background:#ccffcc;" |12.24 (96)
| Port Adelaide
|13.8 (86)
|Norwood Oval
|
| bgcolor="navy" style="color:red" align="center" |Norwood
!10
|- style="background:#fff;"
|24/8
|17
| style="background:#ccffcc;" | Port Adelaide
| style="background:#ccffcc;" |26.17 (173)
| Norwood
|8.8 (56)
|Alberton Oval
|
| bgcolor="Black" style="color:white" align="center" | Port Adelaide
!117
|- style="background:#fff;"
|28/9
| bgcolor="gold" |GF
|  Norwood
| 13.16 (94)
| style="background:#ccffcc;" | Port Adelaide
| style="background:#ccffcc;" |15.15 (105)
| Adelaide Oval
| bgcolor="gold" |58,924
| bgcolor="black" style="color:white" align="center" | Port Adelaide
!11
|- style="background:#fff;"
| rowspan="4" bgcolor="black" style="text-align: center;" div |1958
|25 April
|1
| Norwood
|10.8 (68)
| style="background:#ccffcc;" | Port Adelaide
| style="background:#ccffcc;" |13.19 (97)
|Adelaide Oval
|
| bgcolor="Black" style="color:white" align="center" |Port Adelaide
!29
|- style="background:#fff;"
|14 June
|8
| style="background:#ccffcc;" | Port Adelaide
| style="background:#ccffcc;" |15.12 (102)
| Norwood
|8.9 (57)
|Alberton Oval
|
| bgcolor="Black" style="color:white" align="center" |Port Adelaide
!45
|- style="background:#fff;"
|9/8
|15
| Norwood
|5.10 (40)
| style="background:#ccffcc;" | Port Adelaide
| style="background:#ccffcc;" |10.22 (82)
|Norwood Oval
|
| bgcolor="Black" style="color:white" align="center" |Port Adelaide
!42
|- style="background:#fff;"
|6/9
| bgcolor="#FFFFA6" |SF
| style="background:#ccffcc;" | Port Adelaide
| style="background:#ccffcc;" |16.25 (121)
| Norwood
|10.16 (76)
|Adelaide Oval
|38,035
| bgcolor="Black" style="color:white" align="center" |Port Adelaide
!45
|- style="background:#fff;"
| rowspan="3" bgcolor="black" style="text-align: center;" div |1959
|2 May
|2
| Norwood
|7.11 (53)
| style="background:#ccffcc;" | Port Adelaide
| style="background:#ccffcc;" |22.14 (146)
|Kensington Oval
|
| bgcolor="Black" style="color:white" align="center" |Port Adelaide
!93
|- style="background:#fff;"
|11 July
|11
| style="background:#ccffcc;" | Port Adelaide
| style="background:#ccffcc;" |13.18 (96)
| Norwood
|8.7 (55)
|Alberton Oval
|
| bgcolor="Black" style="color:white" align="center" |Port Adelaide
!41
|- style="background:#fff;"
|15/8
|15
| Norwood
|8.8 (56)
| style="background:#ccffcc;" | Port Adelaide
| style="background:#ccffcc;" |7.17 (59)
|Norwood Oval
|
| bgcolor="Black" style="color:white" align="center" |Port Adelaide
!3
|- style="background:#fff;"
| rowspan="3" align="center" |1960
|21 May
|5
| style="background:#ccffcc;" | Port Adelaide
| style="background:#ccffcc;" |12.21 (93)
| Norwood
|9.10 (64)
|Alberton Oval
|
| bgcolor="Black" style="color:white" align="center" |Port Adelaide
!29
|- style="background:#fff;"
|16 July
|12
| Norwood
|11.8 (74)
| style="background:#ccffcc;" | Port Adelaide
| style="background:#ccffcc;" |11.11 (77)
|Norwood Oval
|
| bgcolor="Black" style="color:white" align="center" |Port Adelaide
!3
|- style="background:#fff;"
|24/9
| bgcolor="#FFFFA6" |PF
| style="background:#ccffcc;" | Norwood
| style="background:#ccffcc;" |8.11 (59)
| Port Adelaide
|3.14 (32)
|Adelaide Oval
|32,627
| bgcolor="navy" style="color:red" align="center" |Norwood
!27
|- style="background:#fff;"
| rowspan="4" |1961
|13 May
|4
| Norwood
|6.10 (46)
| style="background:#ccffcc;" | Port Adelaide
| style="background:#ccffcc;" |12.15 (87)
|Norwood Oval
|
| bgcolor="Black" style="color:white" align="center" |Port Adelaide
!41
|- style="background:#fff;"
|1 July
|11
| Port Adelaide
|10.16 (76)
| style="background:#ccffcc;" | Norwood
| style="background:#ccffcc;" |11.13 (79)
|Alberton Oval
|
| bgcolor="navy" style="color:red" align="center" |Norwood
!3
|- style="background:#fff;"
|19/8
|17
| Norwood
|6.16 (52)
| style="background:#ccffcc;" | Port Adelaide
| style="background:#ccffcc;" |13.14 (92)
|Kensington Oval
|
| bgcolor="Black" style="color:white" align="center" |Port Adelaide
!40
|- style="background:#fff;"
|23/9
| bgcolor="#FFFFA6" |PF
| Port Adelaide
|11.23 (89)
| style="background:#ccffcc;" | Norwood
| style="background:#ccffcc;" |13.13 (91)
|Adelaide Oval
|39,846
| bgcolor="navy" style="color:red" align="center" |Norwood
!2
|- style="background:#fff;"
| rowspan="3" bgcolor="black" style="text-align: center;" div |1962
|25 April
|2
| style="background:#ccffcc;" | Norwood
| style="background:#ccffcc;" |15.14 (104)
| Port Adelaide
|11.16 (82)
|Norwood Oval
|
| bgcolor="navy" style="color:red" align="center" |Norwood
!22
|- style="background:#fff;"
|9 June
|9
| style="background:#ccffcc;" | Port Adelaide
| style="background:#ccffcc;" |18.15 (123)
| Norwood
|10.3 (63)
|Alberton Oval
|
| bgcolor="Black" style="color:white" align="center" |Port Adelaide
!60
|- style="background:#fff;"
|1/9
|19
| Norwood
|16.10 (106)
| style="background:#ccffcc;" | Port Adelaide
| style="background:#ccffcc;" |18.14 (122)
|Kensington Oval
|
| bgcolor="Black" style="color:white" align="center" |Port Adelaide
!16
|- style="background:#fff;"
| rowspan="3" bgcolor="black" style="text-align: center;" div |1963
|13 April
|1
| Norwood
|9.4 (58)
| style="background:#ccffcc;" | Port Adelaide
| style="background:#ccffcc;" |17.17 (119)
|Adelaide Oval
|
| bgcolor="Black" style="color:white" align="center" |Port Adelaide
!61
|- style="background:#fff;"
|22 June
|10
| style="background:#ccffcc;" | Port Adelaide
| style="background:#ccffcc;" |14.19 (103)
| Norwood
|7.4 (46)
|Alberton Oval
|
| bgcolor="Black" style="color:white" align="center" |Port Adelaide
!57
|- style="background:#fff;"
|24/8
|18
| Norwood
|4.8 (32)
| style="background:#ccffcc;" | Port Adelaide
| style="background:#ccffcc;" |8.14 (62)
|Norwood Oval
|
| bgcolor="Black" style="color:white" align="center" |Port Adelaide
!30
|- style="background:#fff;"
| rowspan="2" |1964
|11 April
|1
| style="background:#ccffcc;" | Norwood
| style="background:#ccffcc;" |15.19 (99)
| Port Adelaide
|13.19 (97)
|Norwood Oval
|
| bgcolor="navy" style="color:red" align="center" |Norwood
!2
|- style="background:#fff;"
|18 July
|13
| style="background:#ccffcc;" | Port Adelaide
| style="background:#ccffcc;" |5.12 (42)
| Norwood
|4.13 (37)
|Alberton Oval
|
| bgcolor="Black" style="color:white" align="center" |Port Adelaide
!5
|- style="background:#fff;"
| rowspan="2" bgcolor="black" style="text-align: center;" div |1965
|8 May
|4
| style="background:#ccffcc;" | Port Adelaide
| style="background:#ccffcc;" |13.12 (90)
| Norwood
|6.16 (52)
|Alberton Oval
|11,405
| bgcolor="Black" style="color:white" align="center" |Port Adelaide
!38
|- style="background:#fff;"
|31 July
|15
| style="background:#ccffcc;" | Norwood
| style="background:#ccffcc;" |11.13 (79)
| Port Adelaide
|7.17 (59)
|Norwood Oval
|17,004
| bgcolor="navy" style="color:red" align="center" |Norwood
!20
|- style="background:#fff;"
| rowspan="2" |1966
|7 May
|4
| Port Adelaide
|9.5 (59)
| style="background:#ccffcc;" | Norwood
| style="background:#ccffcc;" |10.9 (69)
|Alberton Oval
|
| bgcolor="navy" style="color:red" align="center" |Norwood
!10
|- style="background:#fff;"
|9 July
|12
| style="background:#ccffcc;" | Norwood
| style="background:#ccffcc;" |14.10 (94)
| Port Adelaide
|12.10 (82)
|Norwood Oval
|
| bgcolor="navy" style="color:red" align="center" |Norwood
!12
|- style="background:#fff;"
| rowspan="2" |1967
|27 May
|7
| Norwood
|13.15 (93)
| style="background:#ccffcc;" | Port Adelaide
| style="background:#ccffcc;" |14.10 (94)
|Norwood Oval
|
| bgcolor="Black" style="color:white" align="center" |Port Adelaide
!1
|- style="background:#fff;"
|19/8
|18
| style="background:#ccffcc;" | Port Adelaide
| style="background:#ccffcc;" |18.17 (125)
| Norwood
|10.7 (67)
|Alberton Oval
|
| bgcolor="Black" style="color:white" align="center" |Port Adelaide
!58
|- style="background:#fff;"
| rowspan="2" |1968
|1 June
|8
| style="background:#ccffcc;" | Port Adelaide
| style="background:#ccffcc;" |11.13 (79)
| Norwood
|7.8 (50)
|Alberton Oval
|
| bgcolor="Black" style="color:white" align="center" |Port Adelaide
!29
|- style="background:#fff;"
|24/8
|19
| Norwood
|5.5 (35)
| style="background:#ccffcc;" | Port Adelaide
| style="background:#ccffcc;" |7.13 (55)
|Norwood Oval
|
| bgcolor="Black" style="color:white" align="center" |Port Adelaide
!20
|- style="background:#fff;"
| rowspan="2" |1969
|3 May
|5
| style="background:#ccffcc;" | Port Adelaide
| style="background:#ccffcc;" |10.18 (78)
| Norwood
|9.14 (68)
|Alberton Oval
|
| bgcolor="Black" style="color:white" align="center" |Port Adelaide
!10
|- style="background:#fff;"
|26 July
|15
| style="background:#ccffcc;" | Norwood
| style="background:#ccffcc;" |11.18 (84)
| Port Adelaide
|9.12 (66)
|Norwood Oval
|
| bgcolor="navy" style="color:red" align="center" |Norwood
!18
|- style="background:#fff;"
| rowspan="3" |1970
|4 April
|1
| style="background:#ccffcc;" | Norwood
| style="background:#ccffcc;" |12.13 (85)
| Port Adelaide
|7.17 (59)
|Norwood Oval
|
| bgcolor="navy" style="color:red" align="center" |Norwood
!26
|- style="background:#fff;"
|4 July
|12
| style="background:#ccffcc;" | Port Adelaide
| style="background:#ccffcc;" |16.11 (107)
| Norwood
|14.3 (87)
|Adelaide Oval
|
| bgcolor="Black" style="color:white" align="center" |Port Adelaide
!20
|- style="background:#fff;"
|29/8
|20
| Port Adelaide
|9.11 (65)
| Norwood
|10.5 (65)
|Alberton Oval
|
| bgcolor="white" style="color:black" align="center" |Draw
!
|- style="background:#fff;"
| rowspan="2" style="text-align: center;" |1971
| 22 May
|  8
|  Norwood
| 9.13 (67)
|style="background:#ccffcc;" |  Port Adelaide
|style="background:#ccffcc;" | 14.21 (105)
| Norwood Oval
| 20,280
| bgcolor="black" style="color:white" align="center" | Port Adelaide
!38
|- style="background:#fff;"
|31 July
|17
|style="background:#ccffcc;" | Port Adelaide
|style="background:#ccffcc;" |15.16 (106)
| Norwood
|10.10 (70)
|Alberton Oval
|
| bgcolor="Black" style="color:white" align="center" |Port Adelaide
!36
|- style="background:#fff;"
| rowspan="2" |1972
|1 April
|1
|style="background:#ccffcc;" | Norwood
|style="background:#ccffcc;" |19.16 (130)
| Port Adelaide
|16.12 (108)
|Norwood Oval
|
| bgcolor="navy" style="color:red" align="center" |Norwood
!22
|- style="background:#fff;"
|3 June
|10
| Port Adelaide
|7.20 (62)
|style="background:#ccffcc;" | Norwood
|style="background:#ccffcc;" |16.20 (116)
|Alberton Oval
|
| bgcolor="navy" style="color:red" align="center" |Norwood
!54
|- style="background:#fff;"
| rowspan="3" |1973
|21 May
|6
|style="background:#ccffcc;" | Norwood
|style="background:#ccffcc;" |19.18 (132)
| Port Adelaide
|8.16 (64)
|Adelaide Oval
|
| bgcolor="navy" style="color:red" align="center" |Norwood
!68
|- style="background:#fff;"
|1/9
|21
|style="background:#ccffcc;" | Norwood
|style="background:#ccffcc;" |11.13 (79)
| Port Adelaide
|6.8 (44)
|Norwood Oval
|
| bgcolor="navy" style="color:red" align="center" |Norwood
!35
|- style="background:#fff;"
|8/9
| bgcolor="#FFFFA6" |EF
| Port Adelaide
|17.13 (115)
|style="background:#ccffcc;" | Norwood
|style="background:#ccffcc;" |23.13 (151)
|Norwood Oval
|17,734
| bgcolor="navy" style="color:red" align="center" |Norwood
!36
|- style="background:#fff;"
| rowspan="3" |1974
|6 April
|1
|style="background:#ccffcc;" | Norwood
|style="background:#ccffcc;" |15.21 (111)
| Port Adelaide
|9.23 (77)
|Norwood Oval
|
| bgcolor="navy" style="color:red" align="center" |Norwood
!34
|- style="background:#fff;"
|15 June
|11
|style="background:#ccffcc;" | Port Adelaide
|style="background:#ccffcc;" |21.19 (145)
| Norwood
|11.11 (77)
|Football Park
|
| bgcolor="Black" style="color:white" align="center" |Port Adelaide
!68
|- style="background:#fff;"
|7/9
| bgcolor="#FFFFA6" |QF
|style="background:#ccffcc;" | Port Adelaide
|style="background:#ccffcc;" |19.15 (129)
| Norwood
|15.13 (103)
|Football Park
|30,858
| bgcolor="Black" style="color:white" align="center" |Port Adelaide
!26
|- style="background:#fff;"
| rowspan="3" bgcolor="navy" style="text-align: center;" div |1975
|7 June
|9
| Port Adelaide
|17.13 (115)
|style="background:#ccffcc;" | Norwood
|style="background:#ccffcc;" |19.19 (133)
|Football Park
|20,054
| bgcolor="navy" style="color:red" align="center" |Norwood
!18
|- style="background:#fff;"
|30/8
|18
|style="background:#ccffcc;" | Norwood
|style="background:#ccffcc;" |25.14 (164)
| Port Adelaide
|11.12 (78)
|Norwood Oval
|19,257
| bgcolor="navy" style="color:red" align="center" |Norwood
!86
|- style="background:#fff;"
|20/9
| bgcolor="#FFFFA6" |PF
|style="background:#ccffcc;" | Norwood
|style="background:#ccffcc;" |11.19 (85)
| Port Adelaide
|8.7 (55)
|Football Park
|36,128
| bgcolor="navy" style="color:red" align="center" |Norwood
!30
|- style="background:#fff;"
| rowspan="3" |1976
|19 April
|3
|style="background:#ccffcc;" | Norwood
|style="background:#ccffcc;" |18.9 (117)
| Port Adelaide
|11.10 (76)
|Football Park
|20,321
| bgcolor="navy" style="color:red" align="center" |Norwood
!41
|- style="background:#fff;"
|3 July
|13
|style="background:#ccffcc;" | Port Adelaide
|style="background:#ccffcc;" |12.10 (82)
| Norwood
|6.15 (51)
|Football Park
|16,747
| bgcolor="Black" style="color:white" align="center" |Port Adelaide
!31
|- style="background:#fff;"
|28/8
|21
|style="background:#ccffcc;" | Port Adelaide
|style="background:#ccffcc;" |24.19 (163)
| Norwood
|12.17 (89)
|Adelaide Oval
|18,034
| bgcolor="Black" style="color:white" align="center" |Port Adelaide
!74
|- style="background:#fff;"
| rowspan="3" bgcolor="black" style="text-align: center;" div |1977
|11 April
|2
| Port Adelaide
|9.13 (67)
|style="background:#ccffcc;" | Norwood
|style="background:#ccffcc;" |22.17 (149)
|Football Park
|23,126
| bgcolor="navy" style="color:red" align="center" |Norwood
!82
|- style="background:#fff;"
|  11 June
|  11
|style="background:#ccffcc;" | Port Adelaide
|style="background:#ccffcc;" |9.17 (71)  
|  Norwood
| 10.9 (69)
| Alberton Oval
| 22,738
| bgcolor="black" style="color:white" align="center" | Port Adelaide
!2
|- style="background:#fff;"
|6/8
|19
| Norwood
|12.9 (81)
|style="background:#ccffcc;" | Port Adelaide
|style="background:#ccffcc;" |13.13 (91)
|Norwood Oval
|16,906
| bgcolor="Black" style="color:white" align="center" | Port Adelaide
!10
|- style="background:#fff;"
| rowspan="4" bgcolor="navy" style="text-align: center;" div |1978
|1 April
|1
|style="background:#ccffcc;" | Norwood
|style="background:#ccffcc;" |11.9 (75)
| Port Adelaide
|8.12 (60)
|Football Park
|19,733
| bgcolor="navy" style="color:red" align="center" |Norwood
!15
|- style="background:#fff;"
|10 June
|11
|style="background:#ccffcc;" | Norwood
|style="background:#ccffcc;" |19.17 (131)
| Port Adelaide
|9.8 (62)
|Norwood Oval
|12,725
| bgcolor="navy" style="color:red" align="center" |Norwood
!69
|- style="background:#fff;"
|2/9
|22
|style="background:#ccffcc;" | Port Adelaide
|style="background:#ccffcc;" |12.15 (87)
| Norwood
|6.10 (46)
|Alberton Oval
|10,936
| bgcolor="Black" style="color:white" align="center" | Port Adelaide
!41
|- style="background:#fff;"
|23/9
| bgcolor="#FFFFA6" |PF
|style="background:#ccffcc;" | Norwood
|style="background:#ccffcc;" |16.12 (108)
| Port Adelaide
|11.8 (74)
|Football Park
|39,000
| bgcolor="navy" style="color:red" align="center" |Norwood
!34
|- style="background:#fff;"
| rowspan="3" bgcolor="black" style="text-align: center;" div |1979
|7 April
|1
| Port Adelaide
|12.17 (89)
|style="background:#ccffcc;" | Norwood
|style="background:#ccffcc;" |19.12 (126)
|Alberton Oval
|14,182
| bgcolor="navy" style="color:red" align="center" |Norwood
!37
|- style="background:#fff;"
|23 June
|12
|style="background:#ccffcc;" | Norwood
|style="background:#ccffcc;" |21.14 (140)
| Port Adelaide
|16.11 (107)
|Norwood Oval
|
| bgcolor="navy" style="color:red" align="center" |Norwood
!33
|- style="background:#fff;"
|27/8
|21
| Norwood
|9.10 (64)
|style="background:#ccffcc;" | Port Adelaide
|style="background:#ccffcc;" |9.16 (70)
|Football Park
|17,268
| bgcolor="Black" style="color:white" align="center" | Port Adelaide
!6
|- style="background:#fff;"
| rowspan="4" bgcolor="black" style="text-align: center;" div |1980
| 12 April
|  2
|style="background:#ccffcc;" | Port Adelaide
|style="background:#ccffcc;" |27.20 (182)
|  Norwood
| 11.8 (74)  
| Alberton Oval
| 13,352
| bgcolor="black" style="color:white" align="center" | Port Adelaide
!108
|- style="background:#fff;"
| 16 June
|  11
|style="background:#ccffcc;" | Port Adelaide
|style="background:#ccffcc;" |23.16 (154) 
|  Norwood
| 9.10 (64) 
| Football Park
| 17,667
| bgcolor="black" style="color:white" align="center" | Port Adelaide
!90
|- style="background:#fff;"
|23/8
|  20
|  Norwood
| 9.9 (63)
|style="background:#ccffcc;" | Port Adelaide
|style="background:#ccffcc;" |17.16 (118)  
| Norwood Oval
| 16,309
| bgcolor="black" style="color:white" align="center" | Port Adelaide
!55
|- style="background:#fff;"
| 4/10
| bgcolor="gold" |GF
|style="background:#ccffcc;" | Port Adelaide
|style="background:#ccffcc;" |11.15 (81)
|  Norwood
| 9.9 (63)
| Football Park
| bgcolor="#FFFFA6" |54,536
| bgcolor="black" style="color:white" align="center" | Port Adelaide
!18
|- style="background:#fff;"
| rowspan="3" bgcolor="black" style="text-align: center;" div |1981
|25 April
|4
|style="background:#ccffcc;" | Port Adelaide
|style="background:#ccffcc;" |15.8 (98)
| Norwood
|8.14 (62)
|Football Park
|17,900
| bgcolor="Black" style="color:white" align="center" | Port Adelaide
!36
|- style="background:#fff;"
|27 June
|13
| Norwood
|8.10 (58)
|style="background:#ccffcc;" | Port Adelaide
|style="background:#ccffcc;" |8.11 (59)
|Norwood Oval
|12,442
| bgcolor="Black" style="color:white" align="center" | Port Adelaide
!1
|- style="background:#fff;"
|5/9
|22
|style="background:#ccffcc;" | Port Adelaide
|style="background:#ccffcc;" |16.23 (119)
| Norwood
|12.1 (73)
|Football Park
|35,213
| bgcolor="Black" style="color:white" align="center" | Port Adelaide
!46
|- style="background:#fff;"
| rowspan="4" bgcolor="navy" style="text-align: center;" div |1982
|10 April
|2
| Port Adelaide
|12.6 (78)
|style="background:#ccffcc;" | Norwood
|style="background:#ccffcc;" |12.13 (85)
|Football Park
|21,171
| bgcolor="navy" style="color:red" align="center" |Norwood
!7
|- style="background:#fff;"
|14 June
|11
|style="background:#ccffcc;" | Port Adelaide
|style="background:#ccffcc;" |11.12 (78)
| Norwood
|8.8 (56)
|Alberton Oval
|13,072
| bgcolor="Black" style="color:white" align="center" | Port Adelaide
!22
|- style="background:#fff;"
|28/8
|  21
|style="background:#ccffcc;" | Norwood 
|style="background:#ccffcc;" |28.17 (185)
|  Port Adelaide
| 10.13 (73)
| Norwood Oval
| 17,667
| bgcolor="Navy" style="color:red" align="center" |Norwood
!112
|- style="background:#fff;"
|19/9
| bgcolor="#FFFFA6" |SF
| Port Adelaide
|14.17 (101)
|style="background:#ccffcc;" | Norwood
|style="background:#ccffcc;" |19.6 (120)
|Football Park
|37,276
| bgcolor="navy" style="color:red" align="center" |Norwood
!19
|- style="background:#fff;"
| rowspan="3" style="text-align: center;" |1983
|9 April
|2
| Port Adelaide
|15.11 (101)
|style="background:#ccffcc;" | Norwood
|style="background:#ccffcc;" |17.6 (108)
|Alberton Oval
|8,338
| bgcolor="navy" style="color:red" align="center" |Norwood
!7
|- style="background:#fff;"
|13 June
|11
|style="background:#ccffcc;" | Port Adelaide
|style="background:#ccffcc;" |14.11 (95)
| Norwood
|14.9 (93)
|Football Park
|33,342
| bgcolor="Black" style="color:white" align="center" | Port Adelaide
!2
|- style="background:#fff;"
|21/8
|20
|style="background:#ccffcc;" | Norwood
|style="background:#ccffcc;" |25.15 (165)
| Port Adelaide
|15.13 (103)
|Football Park
|18,109
| bgcolor="navy" style="color:red" align="center" |Norwood
!62
|- style="background:#fff;"
| rowspan="3" bgcolor="navy" style="text-align: center;" div |1984
|4 May
|6
|style="background:#ccffcc;" | Port Adelaide
|style="background:#ccffcc;" |20.14 (134)
| Norwood
|14.7 (91)
|Football Park
|19,512
| bgcolor="Black" style="color:white" align="center" | Port Adelaide
!43
|- style="background:#fff;"
|7 July
|15
|style="background:#ccffcc;" | Norwood
|style="background:#ccffcc;" |19.7 (121)
| Port Adelaide
|13.11 (89)
|Football Park
|10,823
| bgcolor="navy" style="color:red" align="center" |Norwood
!32
|- style="background:#fff;"
|30/9
| bgcolor="gold" |GF
| style="background:#ccffcc;" | Norwood 
| style="background:#ccffcc;" |15.10 (100)
|  Port Adelaide
| 13.13 (91)
| Football Park
| bgcolor="#FFFFA6" |50,271
| bgcolor="Navy" style="color:red" align="center" |Norwood
!9
|- style="background:#fff;"
| rowspan="3" style="text-align: center;" |1985
|25 April
|4
| Port Adelaide
|19.13 (127)
|style="background:#ccffcc;" | Norwood
|style="background:#ccffcc;" |23.14 (152)
|Football Park
|31,797
| bgcolor="Navy" style="color:red" align="center" |Norwood
!25
|- style="background:#fff;"
|6 July
|13
|style="background:#ccffcc;" | Norwood
|style="background:#ccffcc;" |17.10 (112)
| Port Adelaide
|11.14 (80)
|Norwood Oval
|10,980
| bgcolor="Navy" style="color:red" align="center" |Norwood
!32
|- style="background:#fff;"
|7/9
|22
| Port Adelaide
|14.25 (109)
|style="background:#ccffcc;" | Norwood
|style="background:#ccffcc;" |20.14 (134)
|Football Park
|17,850
| bgcolor="Navy" style="color:red" align="center" |Norwood
!25
|- style="background:#fff;"
| rowspan="3" style="text-align: center;" |1986
|19 April
|4
| Port Adelaide
|13.12 (90)
|style="background:#ccffcc;" | Norwood
|style="background:#ccffcc;" |21.13 (139)
|Football Park
|18,098	
| bgcolor="Navy" style="color:red" align="center" |Norwood
!80
|- style="background:#fff;"
|28 June
|13
|style="background:#ccffcc;" | Norwood
|style="background:#ccffcc;" |22.21 (153)
| Port Adelaide
|13.9 (87)
|Norwood Oval
|11,701
| bgcolor="Navy" style="color:red" align="center" |Norwood
!66
|- style="background:#fff;"
|6/9
|22
| Port Adelaide
|18.10 (118)
|style="background:#ccffcc;" | Norwood
|style="background:#ccffcc;" |22.15 (147)
|Alberton Oval
|16,053	
| bgcolor="Navy" style="color:red" align="center" |Norwood
!29
|- style="background:#fff;"
| rowspan="4" style="text-align: center;" |1987
|2 May
|4
| Port Adelaide
|11.12 (78)
|style="background:#ccffcc;" | Norwood
|style="background:#ccffcc;" |13.6 (84)
|Alberton Oval
|9,183
| bgcolor="Navy" style="color:red" align="center" |Norwood
!6
|- style="background:#fff;"
|5 July
|13
| Port Adelaide
|13.12 (90)
|style="background:#ccffcc;" | Norwood
|style="background:#ccffcc;" |25.22 (172)
|Football Park
|24,323
| bgcolor="Navy" style="color:red" align="center" |Norwood
!82
|- style="background:#fff;"
|5/9
|22
| Norwood
|6.11 (47)
|style="background:#ccffcc;" | Port Adelaide
|style="background:#ccffcc;" |11.10 (76)
|Football Park
|18,793
| bgcolor="black" style="color:white" align="center" |Port Adelaide
!29
|- style="background:#fff;"
|12/9
| bgcolor="#FFFFA6" |QF
| Port Adelaide
|8.16 (64)
|style="background:#ccffcc;" | Norwood
|style="background:#ccffcc;" |15.8 (98)
|Football Park
|27,750
| bgcolor="Navy" style="color:red" align="center" |Norwood
!34
|- style="background:#fff;"
| rowspan="4" bgcolor="black" style="text-align: center;" div |1988
|30 April
|4
| Norwood
|7.15 (57)
|style="background:#ccffcc;" | Port Adelaide
|style="background:#ccffcc;" |9.11 (65)
|Norwood Oval
|13,604
| bgcolor="black" style="color:white" align="center" |Port Adelaide
!8
|- style="background:#fff;"
|2 July
|13
|style="background:#ccffcc;" | Port Adelaide
|style="background:#ccffcc;" |18.9 (117)
| Norwood
|9.11 (65)
|Football Park
|17,785	
| bgcolor="black" style="color:white" align="center" |Port Adelaide
!52
|- style="background:#fff;"
|3/9
|22
|style="background:#ccffcc;" | Port Adelaide
|style="background:#ccffcc;" |12.13 (85)
| Norwood
|8.8 (56)
|Football Park
|32,892
| bgcolor="black" style="color:white" align="center" |Port Adelaide
!29
|- style="background:#fff;"
|17/9
| bgcolor="#FFFFA6" |SF
| style="background:#ccffcc;" | Port Adelaide
| style="background:#ccffcc;" |10.17 (77)
| Norwood
|2.5 (17)
|Football Park
|27,048	
| bgcolor="black" style="color:white" align="center" |Port Adelaide
!60
|- style="background:#fff;"
| rowspan="3" bgcolor="black" style="text-align: center;" div |1989
|8 May
|4
| style="background:#ccffcc;" | Port Adelaide
| style="background:#ccffcc;" |10.12 (72)
| Norwood
|10.7 (67)
|Football Park
|14,029
| bgcolor="black" style="color:white" align="center" |Port Adelaide
!5
|- style="background:#fff;"
|8 July
|13
| style="background:#ccffcc;" | Port Adelaide
| style="background:#ccffcc;" |20.18 (138)
| Norwood
|10.4 (64)
|Alberton Oval
|9,968
| bgcolor="black" style="color:white" align="center" |Port Adelaide
!74
|- style="background:#fff;"
|9/9
|22
| style="background:#ccffcc;" | Norwood
| style="background:#ccffcc;" |18.19 (127)
| Port Adelaide
|9.13 (67)
|Football Park
|27,759
| bgcolor="Navy" style="color:red" align="center" |Norwood
!60
|- style="background:#fff;"
| rowspan="3" bgcolor="black" style="text-align: center;" div |1990
| 25 April
|  2
| style="background:#ccffcc;" | Port Adelaide
| style="background:#ccffcc;" |18.19 (127)
|  Norwood 
| 12.9 (81)
| Football Park
| 36,397
| bgcolor="black" style="color:white" align="center" | Port Adelaide
!46
|- style="background:#fff;"
|1 July
|11
| style="background:#ccffcc;" | Norwood
| style="background:#ccffcc;" |18.11 (119)
| Port Adelaide
|13.14 (92)
|Football Park
| 21,093
| bgcolor="navy" style="color:red" align="center" |Norwood
!27
|- style="background:#fff;"
|8/9
|20
| Norwood
|9.14 (68)
| style="background:#ccffcc;" | Port Adelaide
| style="background:#ccffcc;" |21.24 (150)
|Football Park
| 22,217
| bgcolor="black" style="color:white" align="center" |Port Adelaide
!82
|- style="background:#fff;"
| rowspan="3" style="text-align: center;" |1991
|6 April
|3
| style="background:#ccffcc;" | Norwood
| style="background:#ccffcc;" |16.11 (107)
| Port Adelaide
|12.20 (92)
|Football Park
|
| bgcolor="navy" style="color:red" align="center" |Norwood
!15
|- style="background:#fff;"
|8 June
|12
| Norwood
|10.15 (75)
| style="background:#ccffcc;" | Port Adelaide
| style="background:#ccffcc;" |14.12 (96)
|Norwood Oval
|
| bgcolor="black" style="color:white" align="center" |Port Adelaide
!21
|- style="background:#fff;"
|10/8
|21
| style="background:#ccffcc;" | Port Adelaide
| style="background:#ccffcc;" |15.14 (104)
| Norwood
|13.10 (88)
|Alberton Oval
|
| bgcolor="black" style="color:white" align="center" |Port Adelaide
!16
|- style="background:#fff;"
| rowspan="3" bgcolor="black" style="text-align: center;" div |1992
|25 April
|6
| Norwood
|11.19 (85)
| style="background:#ccffcc;" | Port Adelaide
| style="background:#ccffcc;" |15.17 (107)
|Norwood Oval
|
| bgcolor="black" style="color:white" align="center" |Port Adelaide
!22
|- style="background:#fff;"
|27 June
|15
| style="background:#ccffcc;" | Port Adelaide
| style="background:#ccffcc;" |17.16 (118)
| Norwood
|17.9 (111)
|Alberton Oval
|
| bgcolor="black" style="color:white" align="center" |Port Adelaide
!7
|- style="background:#fff;"
|5/9
|23
| Port Adelaide
|6.12 (48)
| style="background:#ccffcc;" | Norwood
| style="background:#ccffcc;" |14.7 (91)
|Football Park
|
| bgcolor="navy" style="color:red" align="center" |Norwood
!43
|- style="background:#fff;"
| rowspan="4" style="text-align: center;" |1993
|1 May
|5
| style="background:#ccffcc;" | Port Adelaide
| style="background:#ccffcc;" |24.10 (154)
| Norwood
|16.15 (111)
|Alberton Oval
|
| bgcolor="black" style="color:white" align="center" |Port Adelaide
!43
|- style="background:#fff;"
|3 July
|14
| style="background:#ccffcc;" | Norwood
| style="background:#ccffcc;" |21.18 (144)
| Port Adelaide
|10.9 (69)
|Football Park
|
| bgcolor="navy" style="color:red" align="center" |Norwood
!75
|- style="background:#fff;"
|22/8
|21
| style="background:#ccffcc;" | Norwood
| style="background:#ccffcc;" |19.19 (133)
| Port Adelaide
|16.15 (111)
|Norwood Oval
|
| bgcolor="navy" style="color:red" align="center" |Norwood
!22
|- style="background:#fff;"
|26/9
| bgcolor="#FFFFA6" |PF
| Port Adelaide
|16.14 (110)
| style="background:#ccffcc;" | Norwood
| style="background:#ccffcc;" |20.17 (137)
|Football Park
|
| bgcolor="navy" style="color:red" align="center" |Norwood
!27
|- style="background:#fff;"
| rowspan="3" bgcolor="black" style="text-align: center;" div |1994
|2 April
|3
| style="background:#ccffcc;" | Port Adelaide
| style="background:#ccffcc;" |16.16 (112)
| Norwood
|6.16 (52)
|Football Park
|
| bgcolor="black" style="color:white" align="center" |Port Adelaide
!60
|- style="background:#fff;"
|5 June
|12
| Port Adelaide
|11.5 (71)
| style="background:#ccffcc;" | Norwood
| style="background:#ccffcc;" |17.11 (113)
|Alberton Oval
|
| bgcolor="navy" style="color:red" align="center" |Norwood
!42
|- style="background:#fff;"
|6/8
|21
| Norwood
|13.14 (92)
| style="background:#ccffcc;" | Port Adelaide
| style="background:#ccffcc;" |16.13 (109)
|Norwood Oval
|
| bgcolor="black" style="color:white" align="center" |Port Adelaide
!17
|- style="background:#fff;"
| rowspan="4" bgcolor="black" style="text-align: center;" div |1995
|1 April
|3
| style="background:#ccffcc;" | Port Adelaide
| style="background:#ccffcc;" |19.8 (122)
| Norwood
|9.10 (64)
|Alberton Oval
|
| bgcolor="black" style="color:white" align="center" |Port Adelaide
!58
|- style="background:#fff;"
|4 June
|12
| style="background:#ccffcc;" | Norwood
| style="background:#ccffcc;" |23.21 (159)
| Port Adelaide
|10.7 (67)
|Norwood Oval
|
| bgcolor="navy" style="color:red" align="center" |Norwood
!92
|- style="background:#fff;"
|5/8
|21
| style="background:#ccffcc;" | Port Adelaide
| style="background:#ccffcc;" |12.10 (82)
| Norwood
|11.9 (75)
|Football Park
|
| bgcolor="black" style="color:white" align="center" |Port Adelaide
!7
|- style="background:#fff;"
|9/9
| bgcolor="#FFFFA6" |QF
| Norwood
|9.14 (68)
| style="background:#ccffcc;" | Port Adelaide
| style="background:#ccffcc;" |12.12 (84)
|Football Park
|
| bgcolor="black" style="color:white" align="center" |Port Adelaide
!16
|- style="background:#fff;"
| rowspan="4" bgcolor="black" style="text-align: center;" div |1996
|4 May
|6
| style="background:#ccffcc;" | Port Adelaide
| style="background:#ccffcc;" |23.10 (148)
| Norwood
|8.12 (60)
|Alberton Oval
|
| bgcolor="black" style="color:white" align="center" |Port Adelaide
!88
|- style="background:#fff;"
|14 July
|15
| style="background:#ccffcc;" | Norwood
| style="background:#ccffcc;" |21.11 (137)
| Port Adelaide
|9.9 (63)
|Norwood Oval
|16,600
| bgcolor="navy" style="color:red" align="center" |Norwood
!74
|- style="background:#fff;"
|15/9
| bgcolor="#FFFFA6" |QF
| style="background:#ccffcc;" |  Port Adelaide
| style="background:#ccffcc;" | 10.18 (78)
|  Norwood 
| 9.11 (65)
| Football Park
| 31,245
| bgcolor="black" style="color:white" align="center" | Port Adelaide
!13
|- style="background:#fff;"
|29/9
| bgcolor="#FFFFA6" |PF
| style="background:#ccffcc;" |  Port Adelaide
| style="background:#ccffcc;" |9.12 (66)
|  Norwood 
| 9.8 (62)
| Football Park
| 18,338
| bgcolor="black" style="color:white" align="center" | Port Adelaide
!4

Attendance records

Record attendances 

|- style="background:#ccf;"
| width="45" | Crowd
| Year
| Date
| 
| Home Team
| 
| Away Team
| 
| Ground
|Winner
|M
|- style="background:#fff;"
| bgcolor="gold" |58,924
| rowspan="1" style="text-align: center;" |1957
|28/9
| 
| Norwood
|13.16 (94)
| Port Adelaide
|15.15 (105)
| Adelaide Oval
| bgcolor="black" style="color:white" align="center" | Port Adelaide
!3
|-style="background:#fff;"
|54,536
|1980
|4/10
|
| Port Adelaide
|11.15 (81)
| Norwood
|9.9 (63)
|Football Park
| bgcolor="black" style="color:white" align="center" | Port Adelaide
!18
|-style="background:#fff;"
|53,473
|1946
|5/10
|
| Norwood
|13.14 (92)
| Port Adelaide
|9.10 (64)
|Adelaide Oval
| bgcolor="navy" style="color:red" align="center" |Norwood
!28
|-style="background:#fff;"
|50,271
|1984
|30/9
|
| Norwood
|15.10 (100)
| Port Adelaide
|13.13 (91)
|Football Park
| bgcolor="navy" style="color:red" align="center" |Norwood
!9
|-style="background:#fff;"
|44,826
|1955
|1/10
|
| Port Adelaide
|15.11 (101)
| Norwood
|5.8 (38)
|Adelaide Oval
| bgcolor="black" style="color:white" align="center" | Port Adelaide
!63

Record minor round attendances 

|- style="background:#ccf;"
| width="45" | Crowd
| Year
| Date
| 
| Home Team
| 
| Away Team
| 
| Ground
|Winner
|M
|-style="background:#fff;"
|36,397
|1990
|
|2
|Port Adelaide
|
|Norwood
|
|Football Park
|Port Adelaide
|
|-style="background:#fff;"
|35,213
|1981
|
|22
|Port Adelaide
|
|Norwood
|
|Football Park
|Port Adelaide
|
|-style="background:#fff;"
|33,892
|1988
|
|22
|Port Adelaide
|
|Norwood
|
|Football Park
|Port Adelaide
|
|-style="background:#fff;"
|33,342
|1983
|
|11
|Port Adelaide
|
|Norwood
|
|
|
|
|-style="background:#fff;"
|31,797
|1985
|
|4
|Port Adelaide
|
|Norwood
|
|
|
|
|}

References

External links
Official website of Norwood Football Club
Official website of Port Adelaide Football Club
Official SANFL website

South Australian National Football League
Port Adelaide Football Club
Sport in Adelaide
1878 establishments in Australia
Australian rules football rivalries
Sports rivalries in Australia
Recurring sporting events established in 1878